= Chakapuli =

Georgian stew

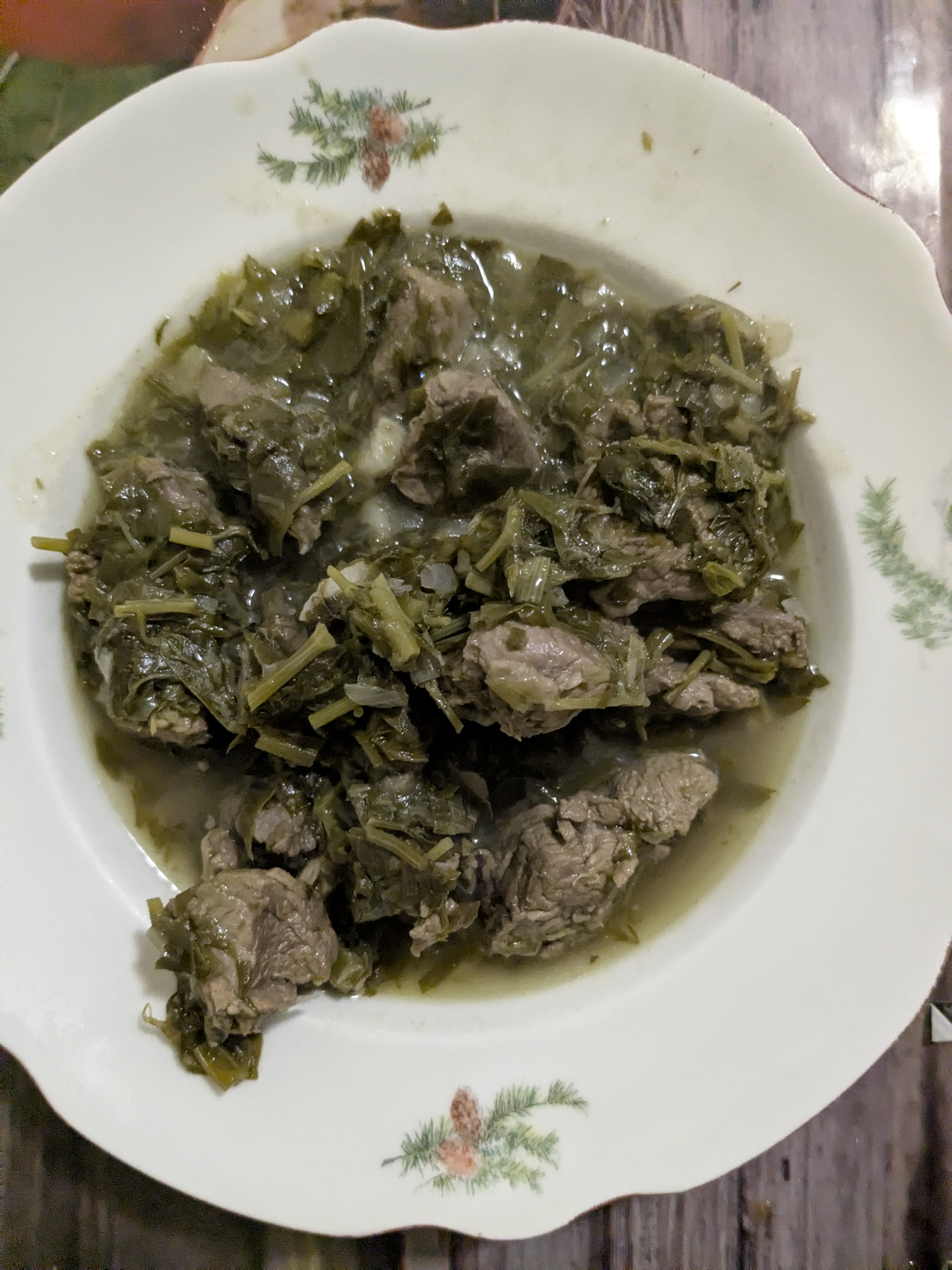
- Type: Stew
- Place of origin: Georgia
- Main ingredients: Lamb or veal, onions, unripe cherry plums or Alucha, dry white wine, tarragon, scallion, herbs, garlic

Chakapuli (Georgian: ჩაქაფული, romanized: chakapuli) is a Georgian stew. It is considered to be one of the most popular dishes in Georgia.

== Preparation ==
It is made from lamb chops or veal, onions, tarragon leaves, unripe cherry plums or tkemali (cherry plum sauce), dry white wine, mixed fresh herbs (parsley, mint, dill, coriander), onion, garlic, and salt. Chakapuli can also be made with beef or mushrooms instead of lamb.

Chopped lamb is boiled with white wine in a deep pan, and then the pan is placed in the oven and cooked slowly for 1.5 hours. After this process, the tkemali sauce is stirred into the lamb, and the chopped greens and garlic are added. The dish is then cooked for another 5 minutes in the oven and finally rested for 5 minutes before serving.

== See also ==
- Chanakhi
- Chakhokhbili
- Khoresh
- List of lamb dishes
- List of plum dishes
- Piti
