= Prune juice =

Juice produced from prunes

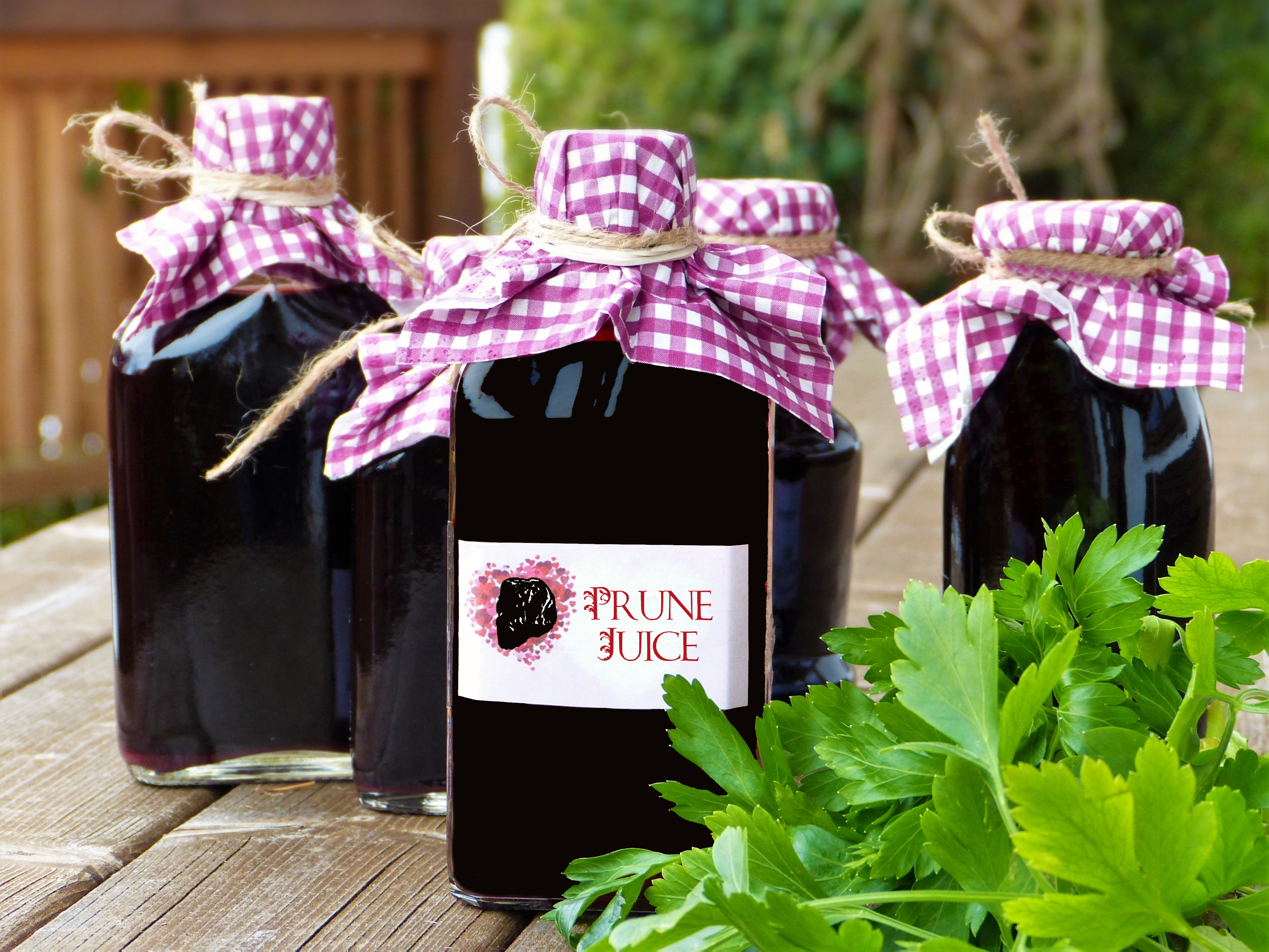

Nutritional value per 100 g
- Energy: 71 kcal (300 kJ)
- Carbohydrates: 17.4 g
- Sugars: 16.4 g
- Dietary fiber: 1 g
- Fat: .03 g
- Protein: .61 g
Vitamins and minerals
| Vitamins | Quantity %DV^{†} |
| Thiamine (B1) | 1%.016 mg |
| Riboflavin (B2) | 5%.07 mg |
| Niacin (B3) | 5%.785 mg |
| Vitamin B6 | 13%.218 mg |
| Vitamin C | 5% 4.1 mg |
| Vitamin E | 1%.12 mg |
| Vitamin K | 3% 3.4 μg |
| Minerals | Quantity %DV^{†} |
| Calcium | 1% 12 mg |
| Copper | 8%.068 mg |
| Iron | 7% 1.18 mg |
| Magnesium | 3% 14 mg |
| Manganese | 7%.151 mg |
| Phosphorus | 2% 25 mg |
| Potassium | 9% 276 mg |
| Selenium | 1%.6 μg |
| Sodium | 0% 4 mg |
| Zinc | 2%.21 mg |
- Other constituents: Quantity
- Water: 81.2 g
- Link to USDA Database entry
- ^{†}Percentages estimated using US recommendations for adults, except for potassium, which is estimated based on expert recommendation from the National Academies.

Prune juice is a fruit juice derived from prunes (dried plums) that have been rehydrated. It is mass-produced, usually via hot extraction, though juice concentrate is typically produced using a low-temperature method. It may be used as a dietary supplement to act as a laxative.

It is an ingredient in many novelty cocktails, such as the Purple Dragon and Constipolitan. It is also sometimes used as a flavor enhancer in tobacco products.

== Composition ==
Prune juice is 81% water, 17% carbohydrates, and 0.6% protein, and contains negligible fat.

In the United States, bottled or canned prune juice contains "not less than 18.5% by the weight of water-soluble solids extracted from dried plums".

=== Nutrition ===
In a reference amount of 100 grams (3.5 oz), canned prune juice supplies 71 calories, and is a moderate source of vitamin B6 (13% of the Daily Value), with no other micronutrients in significant content (table).

=== Phytochemicals ===
Prune juice and plums contain phytochemicals, including phenolic compounds (mainly as neochlorogenic acids and chlorogenic acids) and sorbitol.

== Production ==
Prune juice is often produced using hot extraction methods, whereby the prunes are cooked in hot water, becoming a liquid extract, which is then processed into juice. The process of heating and extraction may occur several times with the same batch of prunes, with the collective extracts from each processing then mixed together to create the final product. Prune juice is a mass-produced product.

Prune juice is also produced as a concentrate, whereby low temperature water is used to create a liquid extract. The concentrate has a high sugar content, and is used by food processors to enhance the flavor of and sweeten products, as a humectant to retain moisture in cookies and cakes, and as an ingredient in cereal bars to bind the ingredients.

== History ==
=== United States ===
Duffy-Mott began producing prune juice in 1933, which was purveyed under the Sunsweet brand name.

The commercial distribution of prune juice in the United States first occurred in 1934, which "began with an output of only 40,000 cases".

== Other uses ==
Prune juice concentrate, prune extracts and plum extracts are sometimes used as an additive in tobacco products to enhance flavor.

== In popular culture ==
In the Star Trek : The Next Generation episode "Yesterday's Enterprise", the Klingon character Worf is introduced to prune juice by Guinan. He declares that it is a "warrior's drink" and begins to drink it regularly in subsequent episodes, even carrying the habit over to Star Trek: Deep Space Nine.

In the series Suits, the character Louis Litt (played by Rick Hoffman) drinks prunies, which are prune juice smoothies.

== Gallery ==
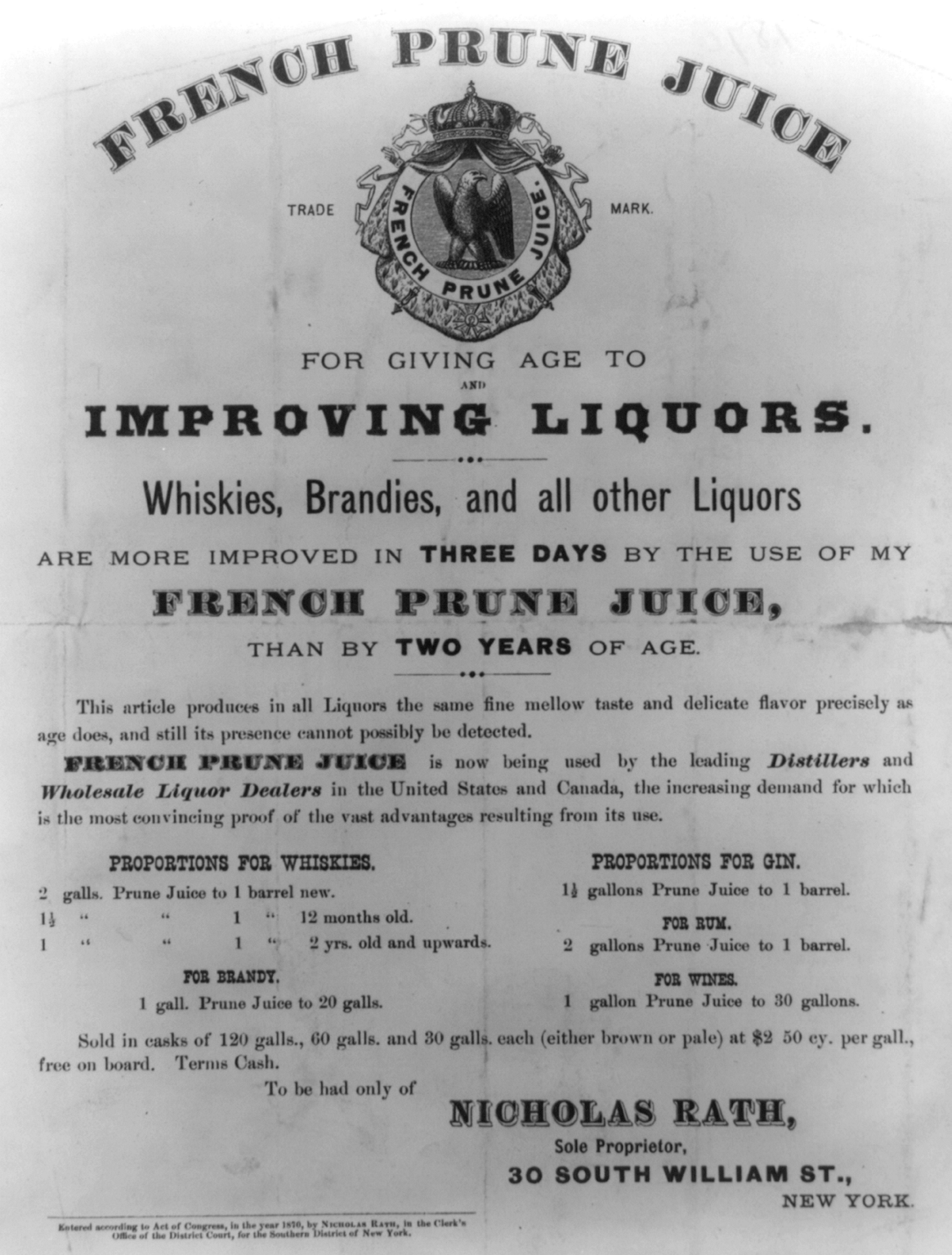
A prune juice label from 1870: "French Prune Juice – For giving age to and improving liquors"

== See also ==
- Chocolate-covered prune
- Juicing
- List of juices
- List of plum dishes
- List of additives in cigarettes
- Suanmeitang – (sour prune drink), a traditional Chinese beverage made from smoked plums, rock sugar, and other ingredients
