= Sunsweet Growers =

Company based in the state of California, United States

Sunsweet Growers, Inc.
- Type: agricultural marketing cooperative
- Founded: 1917
- Headquarters: Yuba City, California, United States
- Products: Prunes, prune juice, dried fruit
- Website: www.sunsweet.com

Sunsweet Growers Incorporated is an American agricultural marketing cooperative founded in 1917 as the California Prune and Apricot Growers Association. Sunsweet is headquartered in Yuba City, California, USA. The company operates the largest dried fruit plant in the world.

== Products ==
Sunsweet manufactures a variety of dried fruit and juice products, although it is best known for prunes. The company produces and distributes prunes, prune juice, cranberries, apricots, nectarines, pineapples, mangoes and dates. Other recent Sunsweet products include Ones (individually wrapped prunes), Jumbo Red Raisins (from large red flame Chilean grapes), PlumSweets (chocolate-covered prunes), PlumSmart plum juice, and Specialty mangoes, blueberries, cherries, and berry blends.

== Prune market domination ==
The company controls more than two-thirds (2/3) of the prune market worldwide.

=== United States ===
Forty thousand (40,000) cases of fruit are marked and sealed for distribution daily at the factory headquarters while its juice products are bottled in Fleetwood, Pennsylvania. Over half the growers in California belong to Sunsweet.

=== Chile and France ===
In Santa Cruz, Chile, in 2004 after the two consecutive years of crop disaster in California, Sunsweet completed a prune drying facility where it made plans to grow and process the dried fruit in an attempt to avert any future disaster says. The entire U.S. exports about 48% of prunes worldwide while the two major competitors, Chile produces 13% (partially due to the Sunsweet facility and growing) and France only about 12%. These statistics are greatly affected by Sunsweet's production.
