= Pflaumentoffel =

German Christmas treat

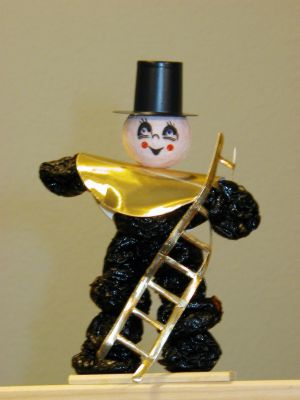
Pflaumentoffel

Pflaumentoffel (probably etymologically related to Toffel, meaning 'stupid, clumsy person') is a traditional German edible sweet in the shape of a human figure made from dried or baked prunes and produced by bakeries, pastry shops and gingerbread makers for children for Christmas.

The sweet became known through its sale at the Dresden Striezelmarkt.

== History ==
The origins of Pflaumentoffel may go back to the seventeenth century. In 1653, the Elector of Saxony decreed that chimney sweeps (Essenkehrermeister) were allowed to employ children to assist with cleaning of chimneys from the inside. This practice usually involved young boy orphans who often went on to die of chimney sweeps' carcinoma. The children's task was to crawl through and clean the high and narrow chimney flues and stacks of municipal civic buildings, and is an early example of state-tolerated child labor. The chimney sweep assistants were sometimes called "fire ruffians", and one suggestion is that the word Pflaumentoffel derived from the words plum and fire devil.

Pflaumentoffel were first mentioned by the painter Philip Otto Runge, who lived in Dresden and described the "little prune men" around Christmas 1801. In the 19th century, it was children, the "Striezelkinder", who, equipped with a tray, sold homemade Pflaumentoffel at Christmas markets in Saxony and the Ore Mountains. In 1910, children were prohibited from selling at markets.

The Pflaumentoffel is regarded as a symbol of good luck and is maintained as a Christmas tradition. It is reminiscent of the idea that chimney sweeps are symbols of good luck, and of the parallel tradition that in some parts of Europe, St. Nicholas also comes down the chimney or that stockings are hung on the fireplace to be filled with sweets at Christmas time.

== Construction ==
The Pflaumentoffel is modeled after a chimney sweep. It consists of about 14 dried or baked prunes, wooden sticks, a painted paper sphere as a head, a cardboard cylinder as a head covering, as well as a shoulder cape and a ladder made of paper covered with metal foil.

== Zwetschgenmännla ==
In Franconia, similar figures, called Zwetschenmännla (lit. 'small prune man') or Zwetschenweibla (lit. 'small prune woman'), are traditionally sold at Christmas markets, for example at the Christkindlesmarkt, Nuremberg.

== See also ==
- List of Christmas dishes
- List of plum dishes
