= Doymenj =

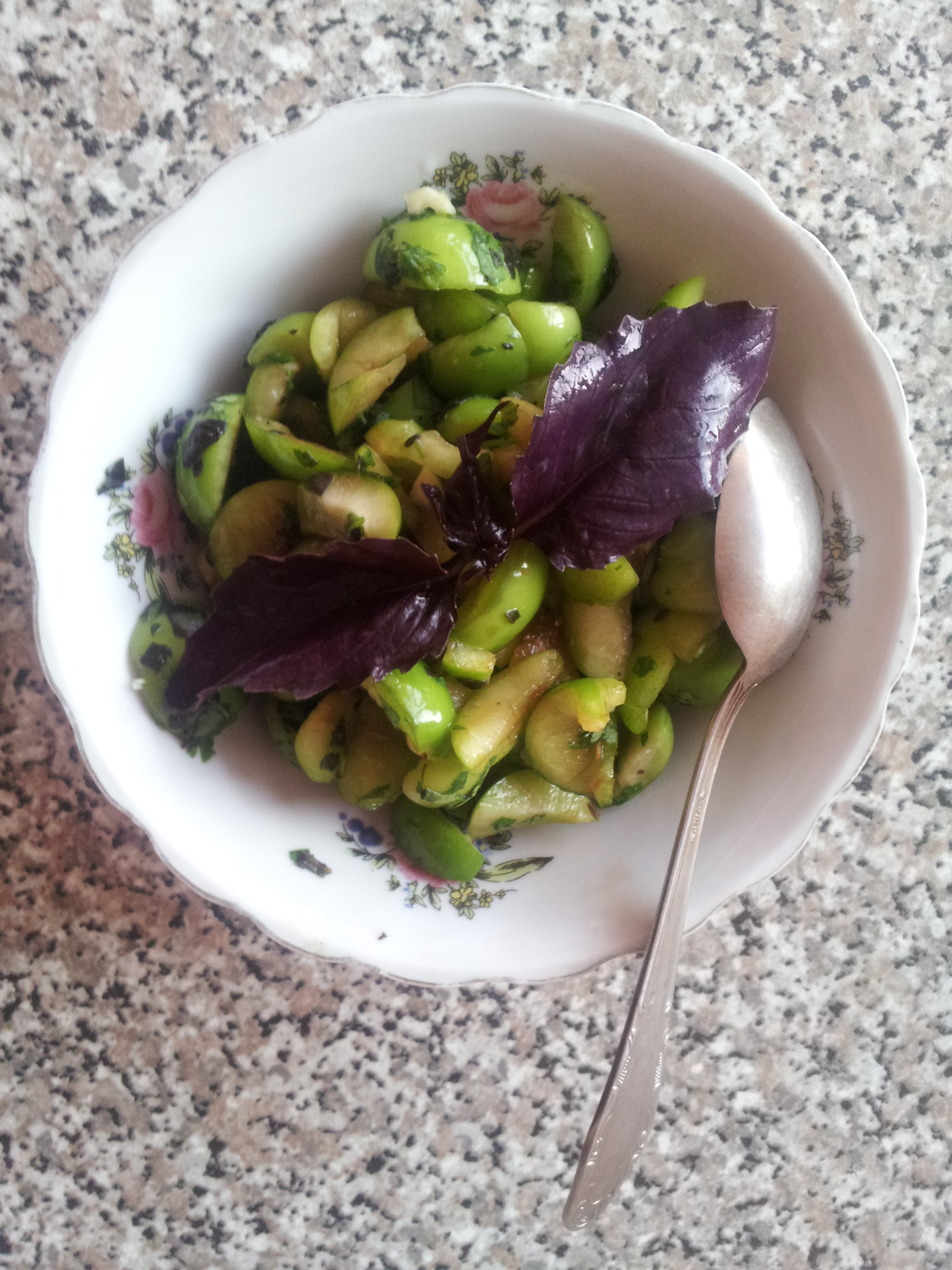
- Alternative names: Doymaj, döymənc
- Type: Snack or side dish
- Place of origin: Azerbaijan
- Main ingredients: Cherry plums, herbs, salt
- Ingredients generally used: Garlic, basil, coriander

Doymenj (Azerbaijani: döymənc) or doymaj (Azerbaijani: döyməc) is a snack food of Azerbaijan, made of crushed cherries with herbs and salt. It is common in the northwestern zone of Azerbaijan (Gabala, Shaki, etc.).
