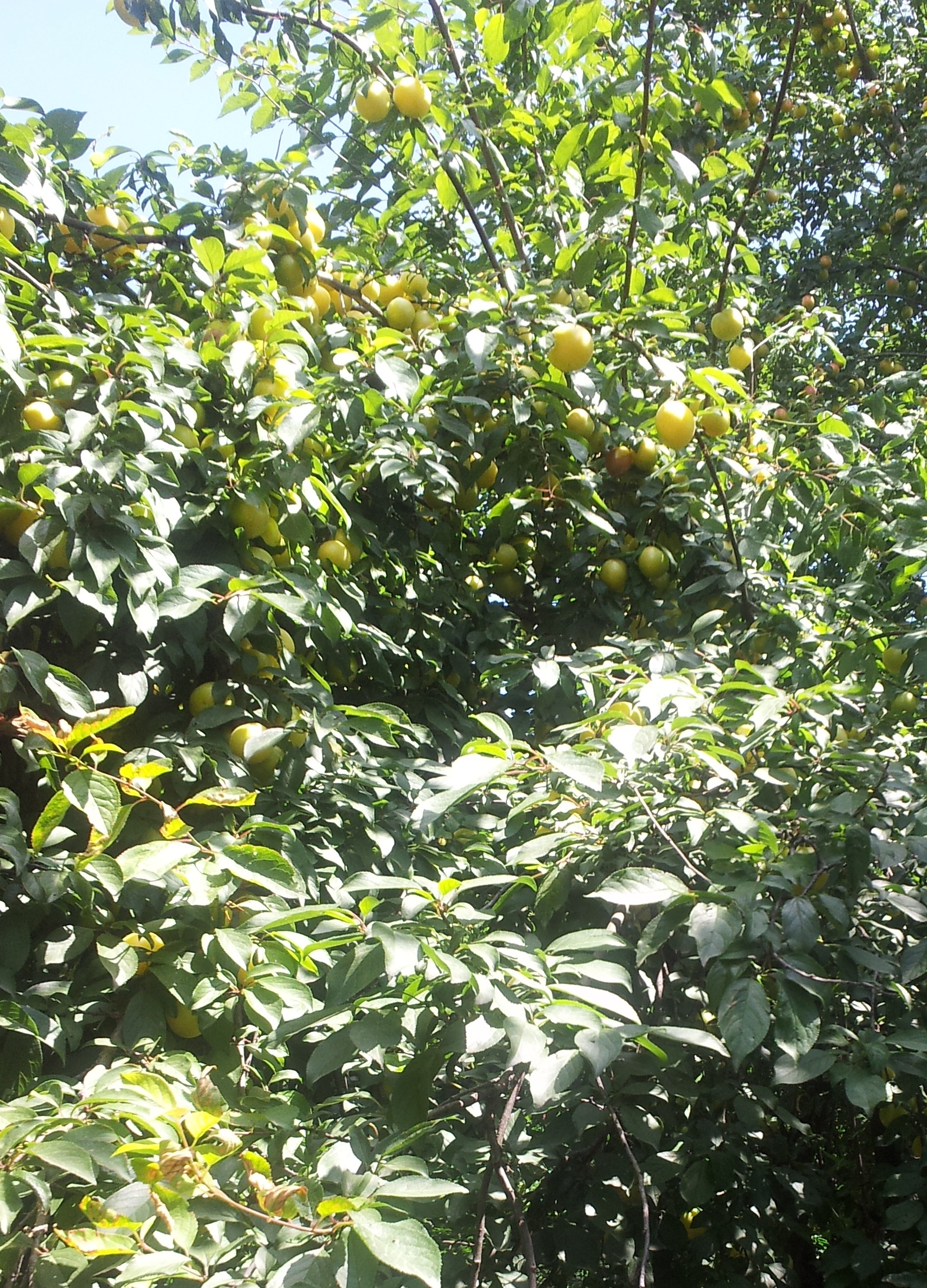
- the tree of Prunus Vachuschtii from up close.

Scientific classification
- Kingdom: Plantae
- Clade: Embryophytes
- Clade: Tracheophytes
- Clade: Spermatophytes
- Clade: Angiosperms
- Clade: Eudicots
- Clade: Rosids
- Order: Rosales
- Family: Rosaceae
- Genus: Prunus
- Section: Prunus sect. Prunus
- Species: P. vachuschtii

Binomial name
- Prunus vachuschtii Bregadze, 1976

= Prunus vachuschtii =

Species of tree

Prunus vachuschtii (Georgian: ალუჩა, romanized: alucha; Armenian: ալոճ, romanized: aloj; Azerbaijani: alça) is a species of plum that is native to the Caucasus region.

== Uses ==
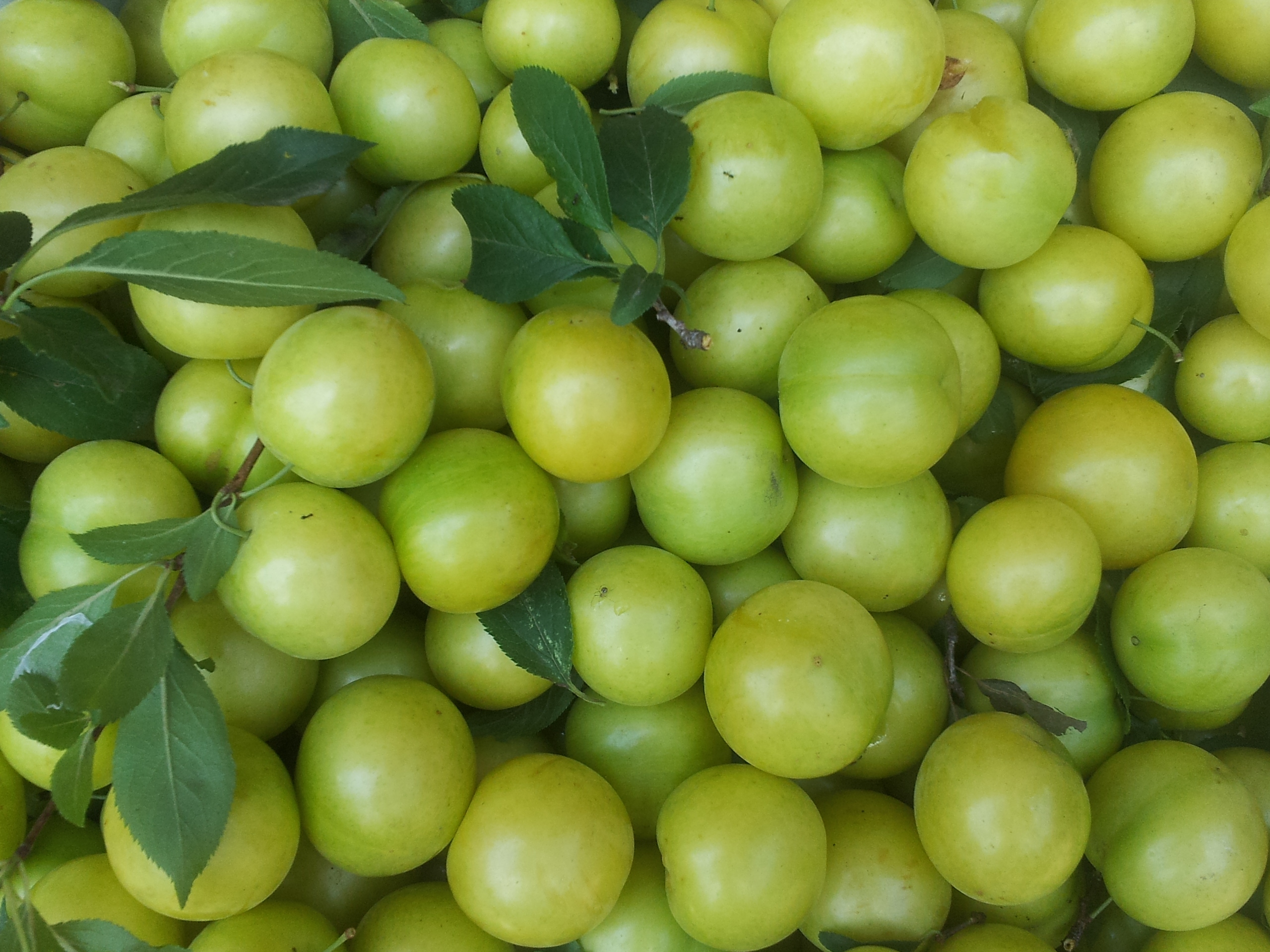
The fruit is green even when it is fully ripe

In Georgia, it is usually eaten by hand and is used to make tkemali, a tart sauce for meat dishes. Although it is probably conspecific with Prunus cerasifera, the cherry plum (in Georgian: ტყემალი, romanized: t'q'emali), Georgians distinguish the two botanically and culinarily. In the Caucasus, P. vachuschtii tends to be found from Caspian sea level up to 500–700 m and P. cerasifera tends to be found at higher elevations, up to 1600–1800 m.

== Classification ==
N. N. Bregadze, who was apparently quite the splitter, described the species in 1976, and identified three forms; Prunus vachuschtii f. imeretinea, P. v. f. meczibuche, and P. v. f. vachuschtii.

== See also ==
- List of plum dishes
