= Striezelmarkt =

Street market in Dresden, Germany

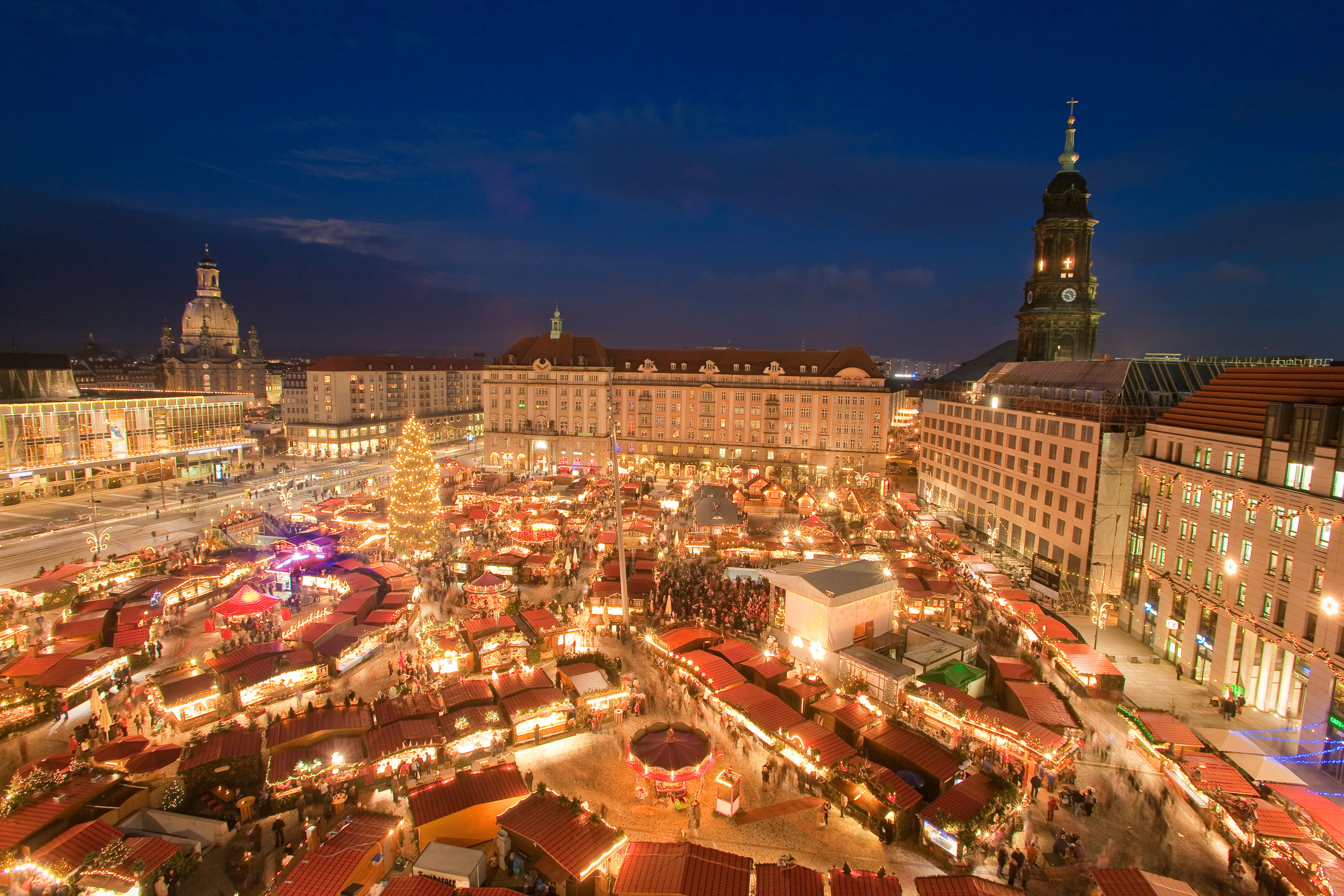
Striezelmarkt in the evening

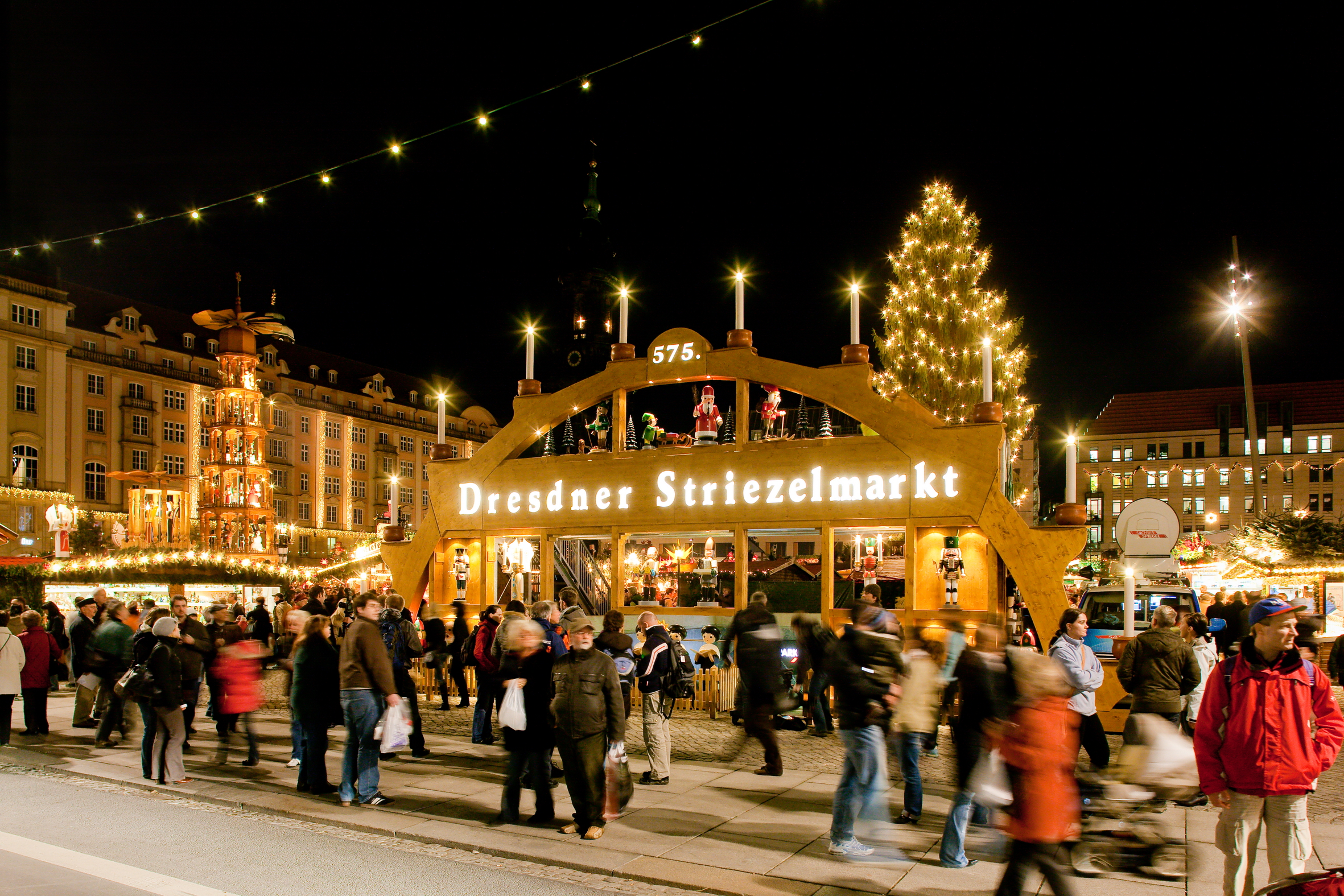
World's largest usable Christmas arch

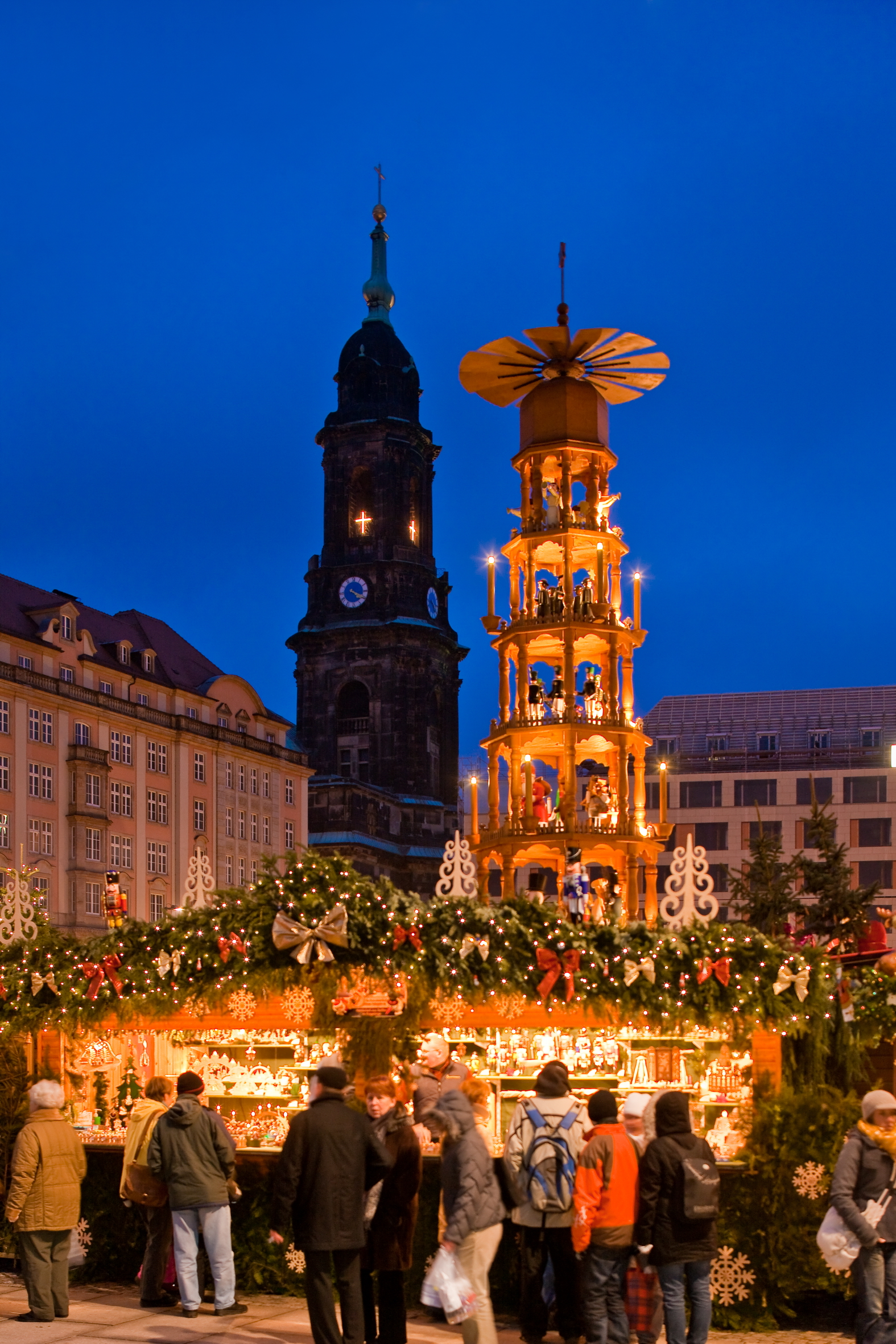
Christmas pyramid with Kreuzkirche in the background

The Striezelmarkt in Dresden is one of the first genuine Christmas markets in the world. Founded as a one-day market in 1434, it celebrated its 590th anniversary in 2024. Its 240 stands attract about 3 million visitors from all over the world. The annual market lasts throughout the Advent season until Christmas Eve.

== History and naming ==
This market event was first mentioned in 1434, under Friedrich II, Elector of Saxony, when it was held the Monday before Christmas on the Altmarkt square. Originally, it was a one-day market to provide the citizens of Dresden with the sale of meat for the Christmas meal after the traditional Advent period of fasting.

In the 21st century, the Striezelmarkt has developed into a huge event with 240 stands. It takes up a large part of Dresden city centre and lasts throughout the Advent period until Christmas Eve.

The word Striezelmarkt comes from Strüzel or Stroczel, which was the name of a type of cake sold at the market; it is now widely known as Stollen or Christstollen. Stollen is a light airy fruitcake that is quite low in sugar, and today is available in many parts of the world. The true Dresden Stollen, however, is produced in the city and distinguished by a special seal depicting Augustus II, Elector of Saxony and King of Poland. The shape of the cake is meant to be reminiscent of the entrance to a mine tunnel (the literal meaning of Stollen), reflecting the area's silver and tin mining history.

== Features of today's Striezelmarkt ==
Today the most famous features of Dresden Striezelmarkt are the world's largest usable Christmas arch with a breadth of 13.5 metres (44 ft) and a height of more than 5 metres (16 ft) and the 14-metre (46 ft) high Erzgebirge Christmas pyramid. Situated on the Dresden Striezelmarkt is a children's adventure world. Here, the prune chimney sweep’s cottage and the bakery are open for kneading and arts and crafts. A puppet theatre, merry-go-round, and a children's railway are also operating. On the Dresden Striezelmarkt, a daily stage programme takes place. During Advent weekends, special events such as Dresden Stollen Festival and Pyramid and Christmas Arch Festival take place.

At the centre of the Striezelmarkt stands a 20 metres (66 ft) high spruce, brought from the nearby Tharandt woods and decorated with lights. At the back of the market square there is a painted wooden fairy-tale castle, designed to operate as a giant Advent calendar. Children's entertainers open a door each day and present a puppet show. On Fridays, Father Christmas himself visits.

- Wooden ornaments

Many of the stands at the Striezelmarkt sell carved wooden ornaments of a huge variety of shapes and sizes. This practice dates to the period of the area's mining history. Dresden is the largest city near the Erzgebirge, or Ore Mountains, where silver and tin were discovered in around 1168. The discovery brought many miners to the area, but they lost their jobs as a result of the German Peasants' War and competition from abroad. Needing a new way to earn money, the miners took up woodcarving, incorporating mining symbols and religious elements into their designs. These symbols can still be found in the Christmas ornaments sold at the Striezelmarkt.

- Candle pyramids (Christmas pyramid)

In many parts of Germany, the candle pyramid (lightstock) is brought out every year to light up the room at Christmas. Two to five round wooden tiers, gradually smaller towards the top, are built onto a central rod. The tiers rotate, driven by the heat of candles rising up into a rotor at the top. On each tier there are figures connected with Christmas. The whole ornament is usually about 50 cm (20 in) high. The tallest pyramid in the world dominates the Striezelmarkt, towering a full 14 m (46 ft) in the air. Originally, the pyramid was a much simpler affair, simply a frame to hang sprigs of fir upon. The modern-day pyramid was not developed until the early 19th century.

- Schwibbogen

Literally, the word Schwibbogen means an arch "hanging" (schweben) above you, between two walls. This candle-holder is arch-shaped, representing the arched entrance to a mine hung with guiding lights; it is another connection to the area's mining past. Today the "candles" are often lit with electricity. The scenes cut from the wooden centre of the arch are not only on mining themes. At night during Advent, nearly every single window in Dresden is lit with these ornaments, traditionally bought at the Striezelmarkt.

- Räuchermann (smoking man)

Another ornament always present at Christmas-time in Germany, the smoking man is hollowed out with a hole leading to his mouth, hung with a pipe. An incense candle is placed inside him so that he appears to smoke as it burns. Variations on the smoking man include old ladies in rocking chairs, Father Christmases, and figures representing nearly every occupation. Smoking men first appeared in the Striezelmarkt in the 19th century.

- Nutcrackers

The type of nutcracker traditionally sold at the Striezelmarkt, carved and painted with a red coat like a soldier, probably became popular world-wide thanks to Tchaikovsky's Nutcracker Suite and related ballets. The first wood turner to carve the ornaments in this form, Wilhelm Friedrich Füchtner from the Ore Mountains, is said to have been inspired by the nutcracker in the story book Tchaikovsky drew from for his ballet.

== Food and drinks ==
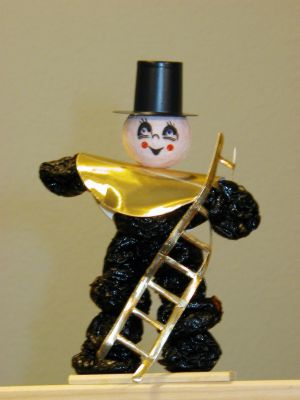
Pflaumentoffel, a chimney sweep's boy

Apart from the famous Stollen, other specialities originate from Dresden and were originally sold at the Striezelmarkt.

- Pflaumentoffel

Although they are made of prunes, these little figures are really decorations, although they can be eaten after Christmas. Pflaumentoffel means plum devil; (also called Feuerrüpel or Fiery Santa), although they are not meant to be devils or Santas, but chimney sweeps, all dressed in black (the prunes) with a top hat and a brush. Until the 20th century, Pflaumentoffel were sold at the Striezelmarkt on trays carried by children trying to earn some Christmas money. The artist Ludwig Richter famously portrayed these Striezelkinder in 1853 in his woodcut "Ausverkauft wegen Geschäftsaufgabe" ("Sold out as giving up business"). In 1910, however, sale by children was banned at the Striezelmarkt.

- Pulsnitzer Pfefferkuchen (Pulsnitz gingerbread)

The Christmas market at Nuremberg (Christkindlmarkt) is more famous for its gingerbread known as Lebkuchen, but the Striezelmarkt's gingerbread has nearly as long a history. Pfefferkuchen literally means "pepper cake": the word "pepper" was used to mean any new foreign spice. The gingerbread sold at the Striezelmarkt comes from Pulsnitz, a town about 50 km from Dresden; it was first mentioned as a speciality from Pulsnitz in a decree issued in 1558 allowing bakers to produce it there. Pfefferkuchen are usually filled with marmalade or jam and covered with chocolate. Unlike gingerbread from other countries, the dough does not usually contain any fat, or indeed ginger, but instead nutmeg, cinnamon, ground cloves and allspice, which are added after the dough has been left up to 6 months to mature. In 1780 eight master bakers came personally from Pulsnitz to sell their wares at the Striezelmarkt; today there are many more Pfefferkuchen stands, but the gingerbread is usually sold by hired staff.

- Glühwein (mulled wine)

One very well-loved tradition on a cold December night in Dresden is drinking steaming mugs of mulled wine at the Striezelmarkt. The hot red wine spiced with cloves and cinnamon is served in specially decorated mugs.

== See also ==
- List of Christmas markets
- Christmas market
- Cuisine of Germany
