= Tkemali =

Georgian plum sauce

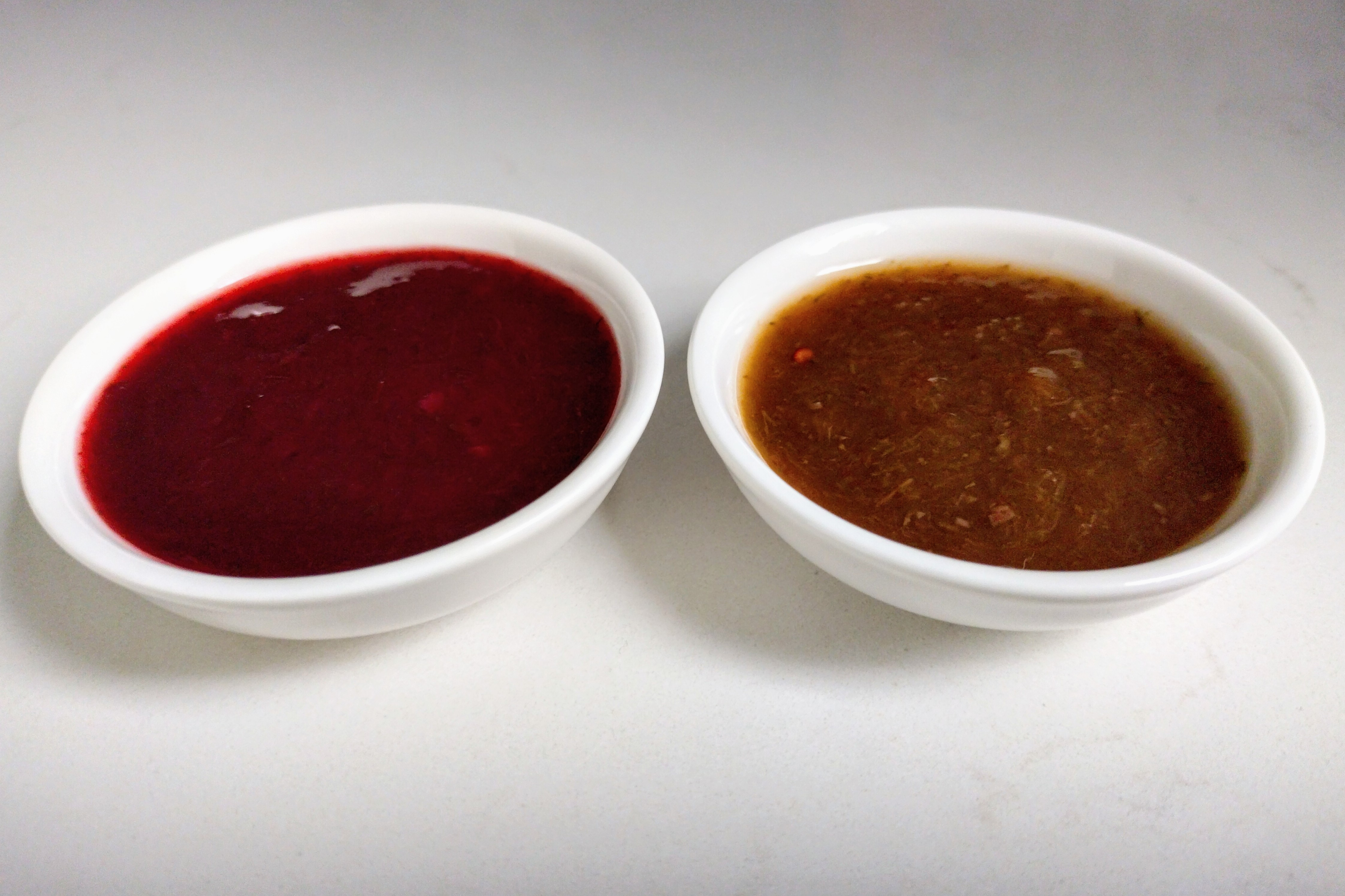
- Alternative names: Tqemali
- Place of origin: Georgia
- Main ingredients: Plums (cherry plum or alucha), garlic, pennyroyal, cumin, coriander, chili pepper and salt

Tkemali (Georgian: ტყემალი, romanized: t'q'emali) is a Georgian sauce primarily made of cherry plum; alucha plum and red-leaf plum are also common plum species used to make Tkemali in Georgia. While the sauce is typically red, both red and green varieties of these plums may be used.

The flavor of the sauce varies based on the ripeness of the plum, but generally tends to be pungently tart. To lower the tartness level, sweeter types of plums are occasionally added during preparation. Traditionally, in addition to plum, the following ingredients are used: garlic, pennyroyal, coriander, dill, chili pepper and salt.

Tkemali is primarily used as a condiment for fried or grilled meat, poultry, and potato dishes, and has a place in Georgian cuisine similar to the one that ketchup has in the United States. It can be made at home, but is also mass-produced by several Georgian companies.

It is a popular sauce in Russian cuisine and is produced by many Russian sauce manufacturers.

== See also ==
- List of plum dishes
- List of dips
- List of sauces
