= List of plum dishes =

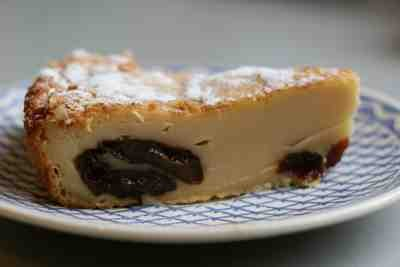
Far Breton is a specialty of the Brittany (or Bretagne as it is known locally) region of France. It is a very simple flan-like cake and includes prunes, which are sometimes soaked beforehand in brandy.

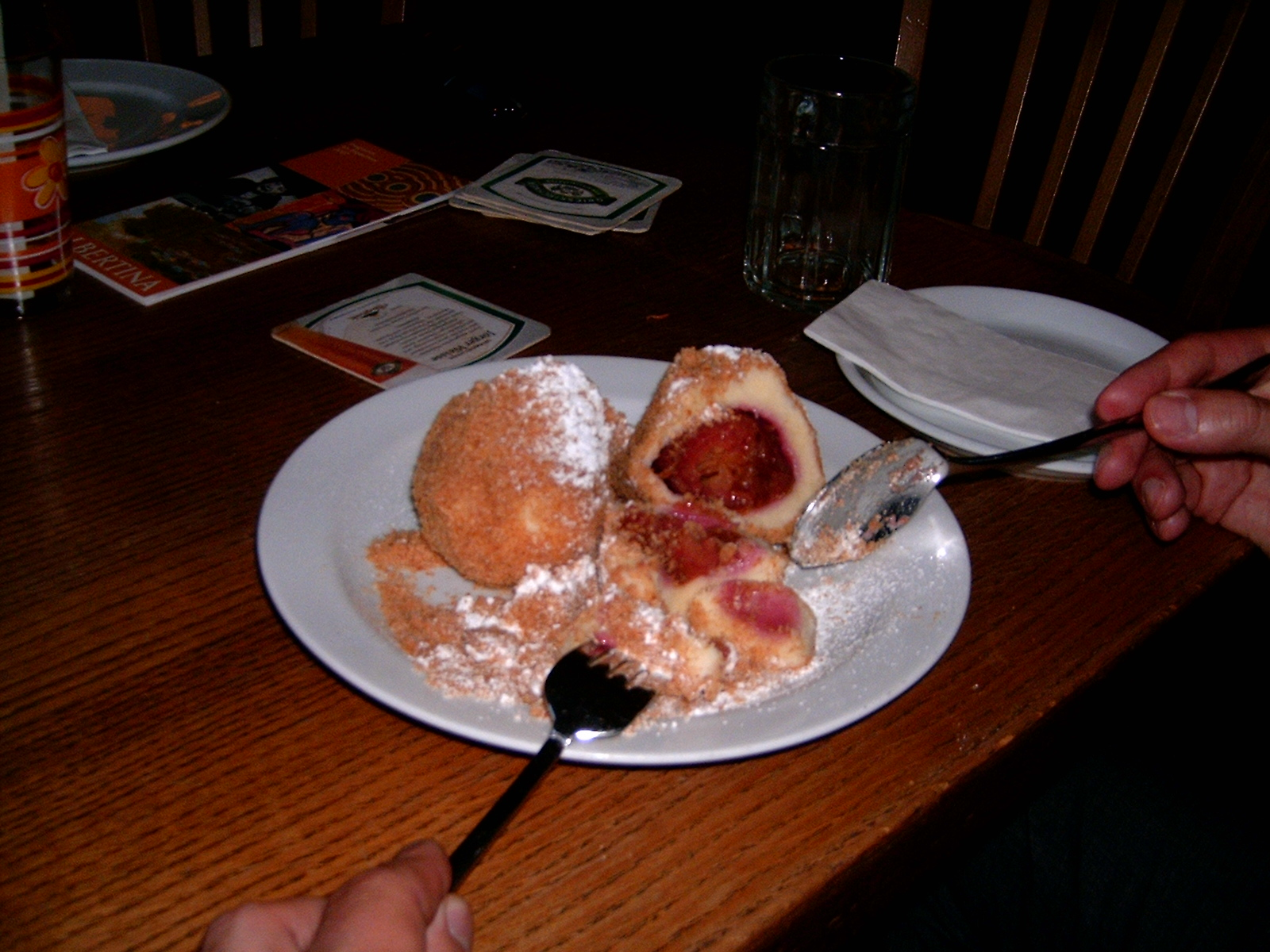
A plum knödel

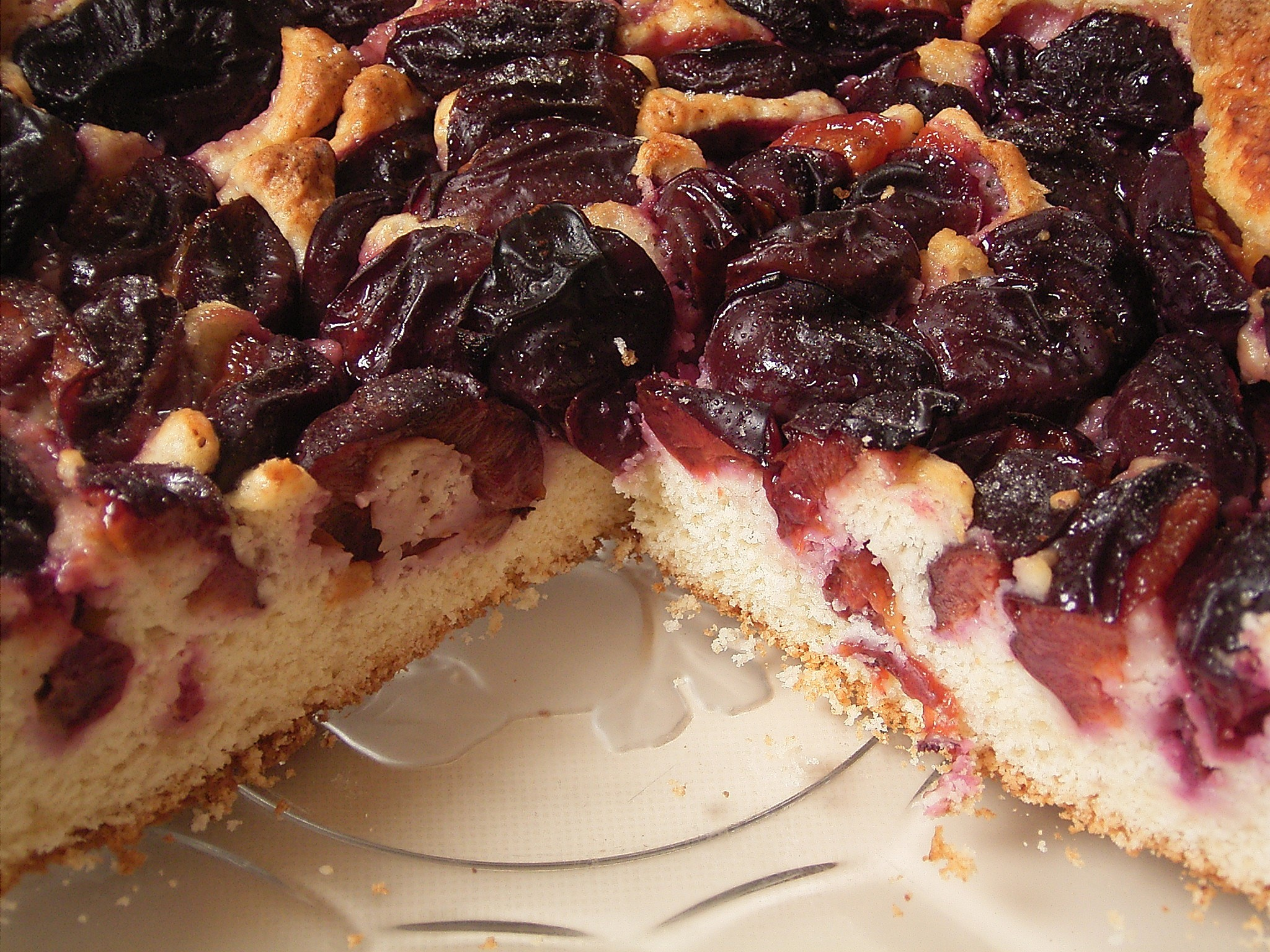
Plum cake

This is a list of plum dishes. Plum dishes are those that use plums or prunes as a primary ingredient. Some plum dishes also use other fruits in their preparation. Plum and prune snack foods and beverages are also included in this list.

== Plum dishes ==
- Chakapuli – Georgian stew
- Chocolate-covered prune – Confectionery
- Colțunași – dumpling sometimes prepared with a filling of a whole plum
- Damson gin – Liqueur
- Erik Ași – plum dish in Turkish cuisine prepared with prunes, rice and sugar
- Far Breton – Dessert cake from Brittany, France
- Germknödel – German and Austrian yeast dough dumpling
- Hitlerszalonna – World War II provision eaten by Hungarians
- Kharcho – Traditional Georgian soup
- Knödel – Large round poached or boiled potato or bread dumplings, made without yeast – some varieties are prepared using plum
- Li hing mui – Salty dried Chinese plum
- Magiun of Topoloveni – Romanian plum jam
- Pflaumentoffel – German Christmas treat
- Plum dumplings – European dish of boiled dumplings
- Plum jerkum – Alcoholic drink
- Plum cake – Range of cakes made with dried or fresh fruit
- Plum jam
- Plum pie
- Plum sauce – Chinese condiment
- Powidl – Sweet prune spread
- Prune cake – Range of cakes made with dried or fresh fruit
- Prune juice – Juice produced from prunes
- Slivovitz – Slavic fruit brandy
- Sloe gin – Red liqueur made from gin and blackthorn drupes
- Suanmeitang – traditional Chinese beverage made from sour plums (specifically, smoked Chinese plums), rock sugar, and other ingredients such as sweet osmanthus.
- Tajine – Maghrebi dish prepared in the earthenware pot of the same name
- Tkemali – Georgian plum sauce
- Umeboshi – Sour pickled Japanese fruit
- Umeshu – Japanese liqueur
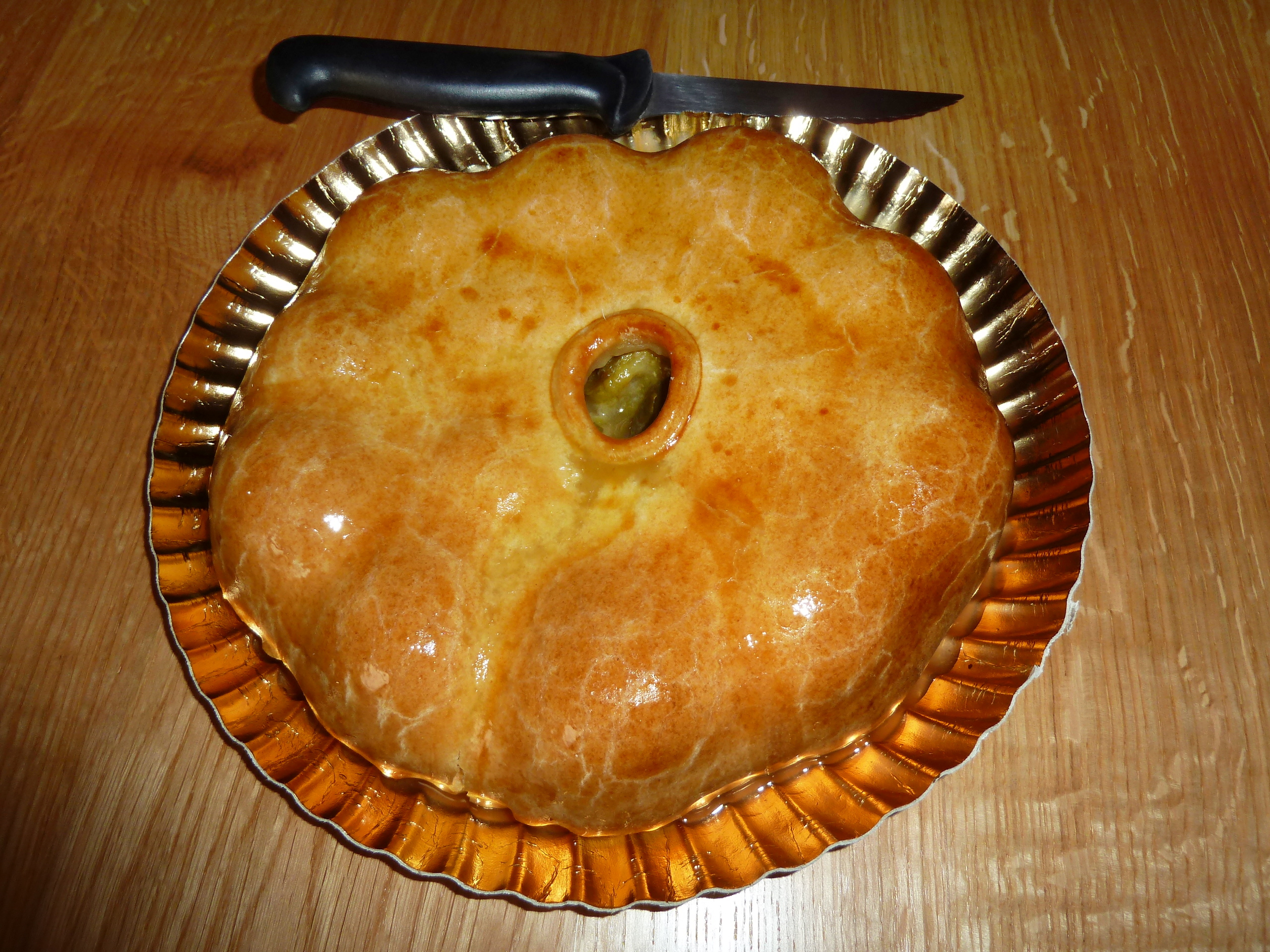
Pâté aux prunes (plums pâté) – a special pastry of the city of Angers, France

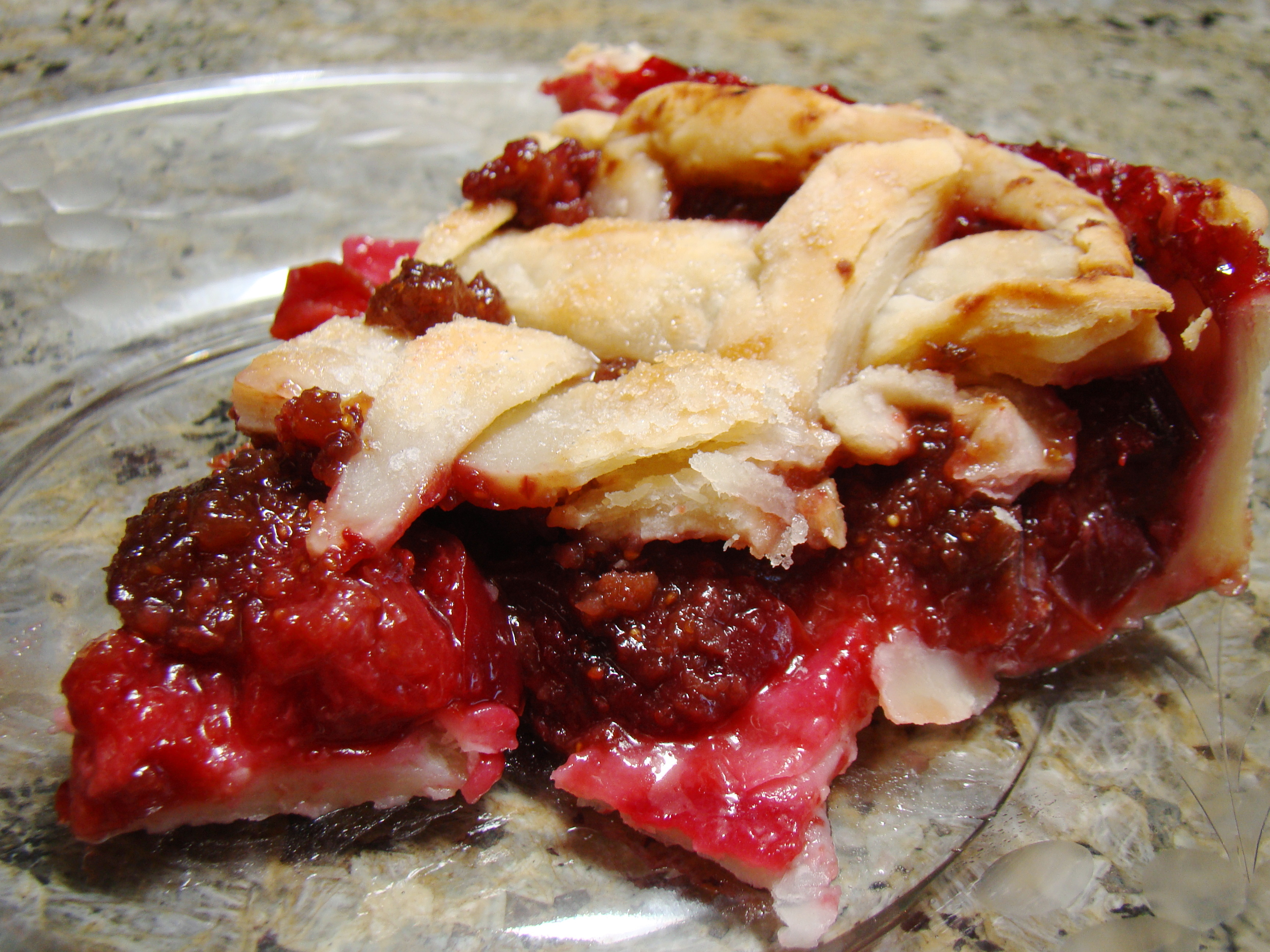
A slice of pie prepared with Satsuma plums and black figs

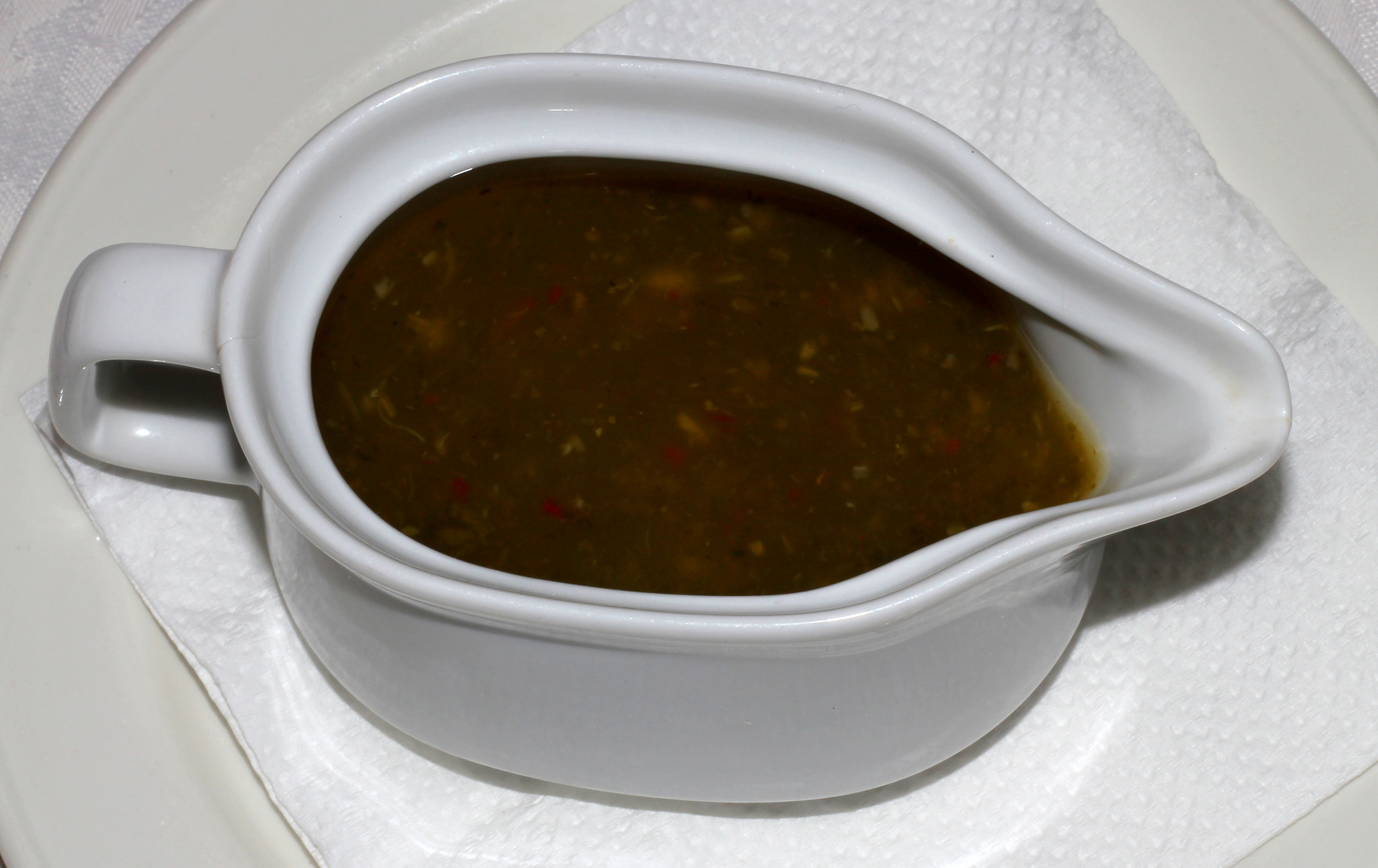
Tkemali is a Georgian sour plum sauce made of cherry plums

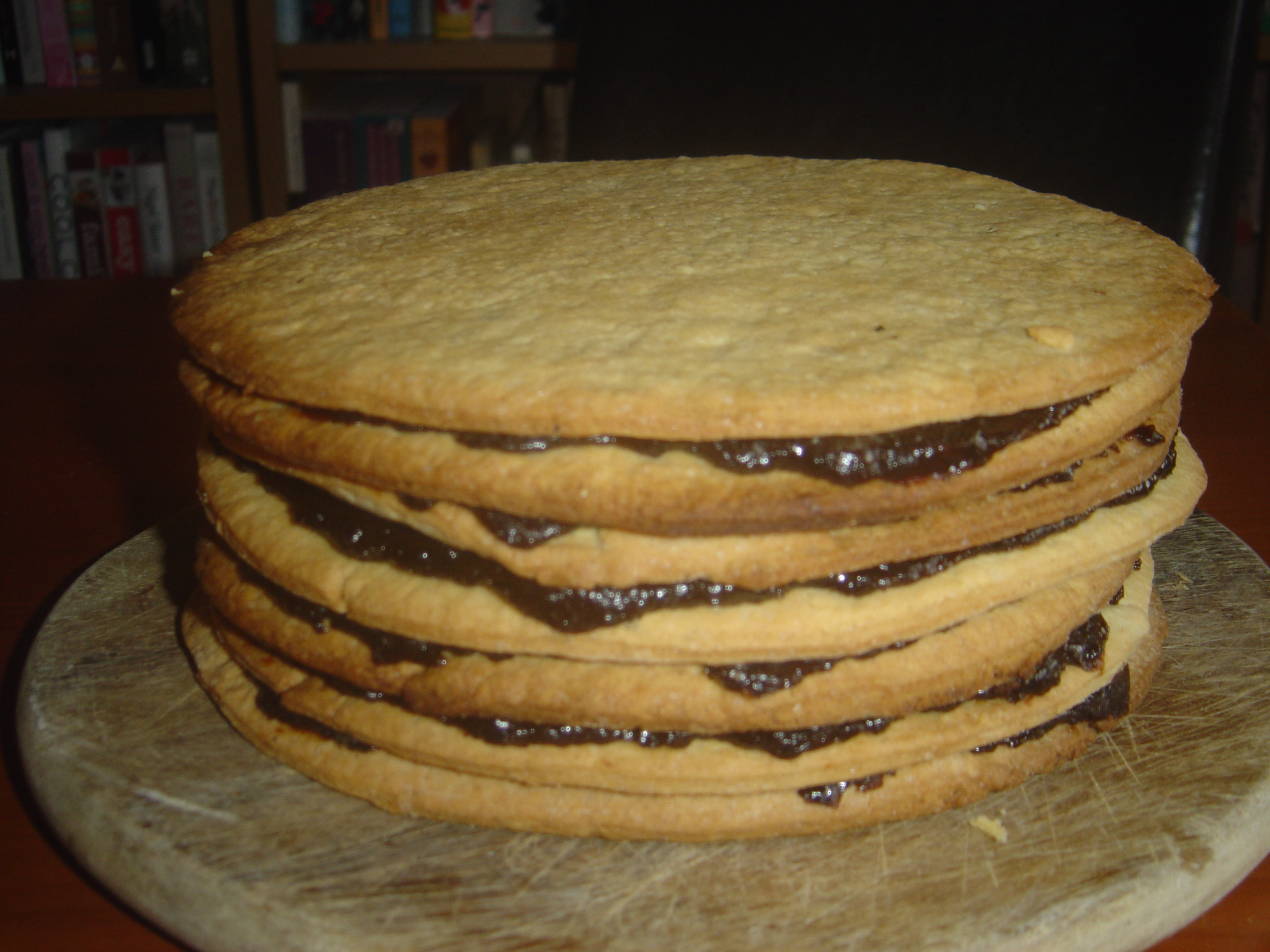
Vínarterta – a layered Icelandic cake with prune jam filling

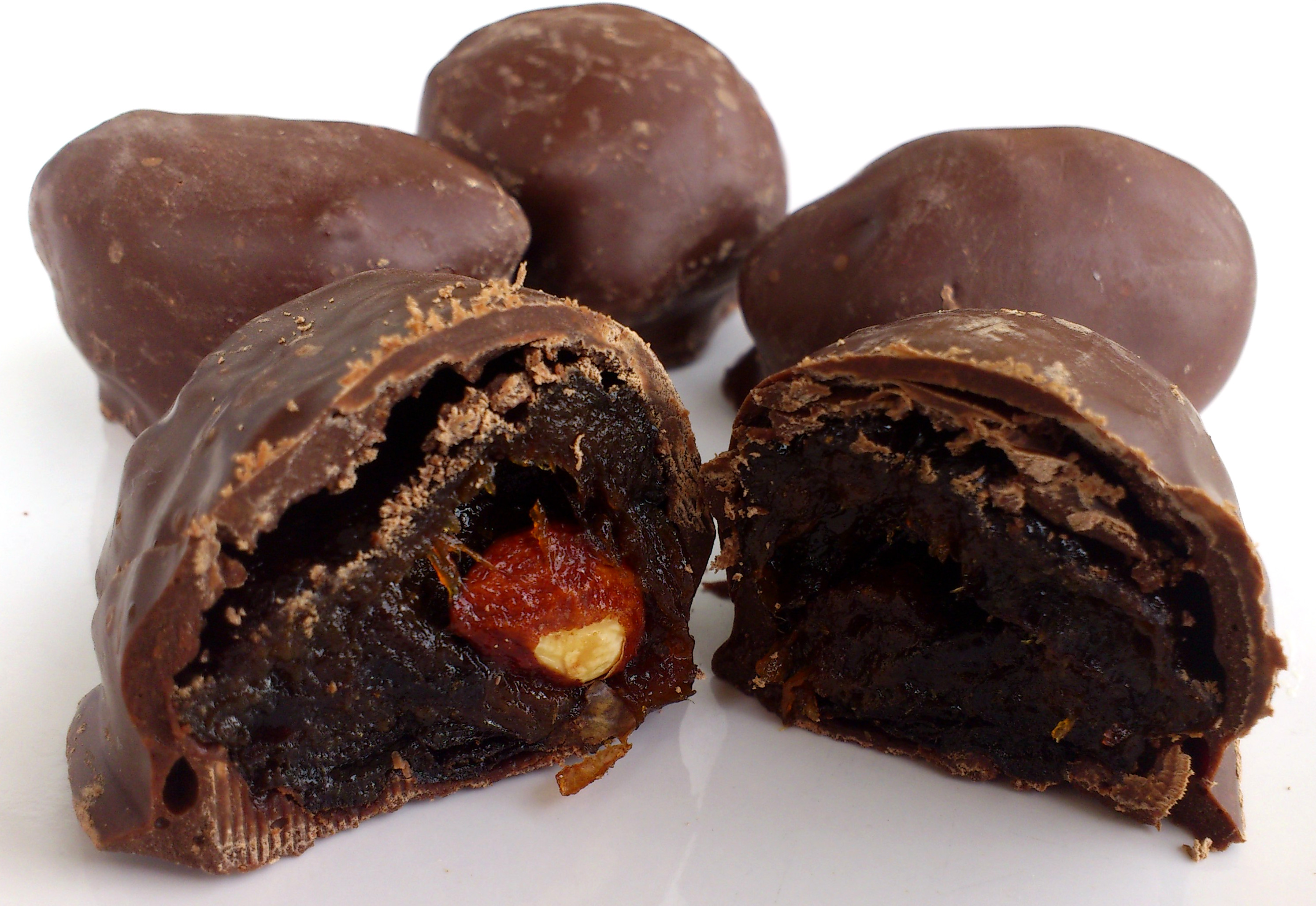
Russian prunes in chocolate with an almond in the middle

== See also ==
- List of culinary fruits
- List of fruit dishes
- Lists of prepared foods
