= Chocolate-covered prune =

Confectionery

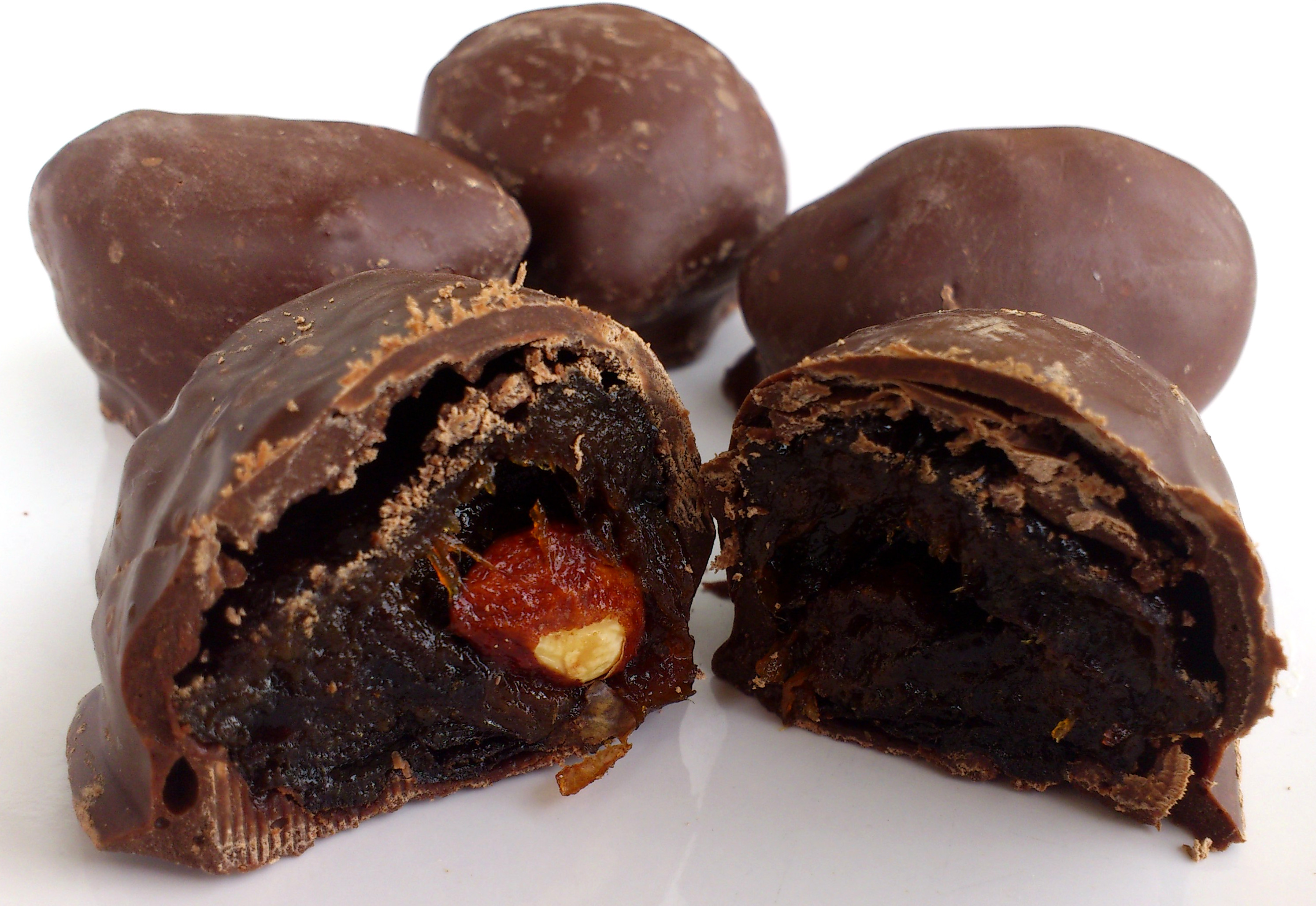
Russian prunes in chocolate with an almond in the middle

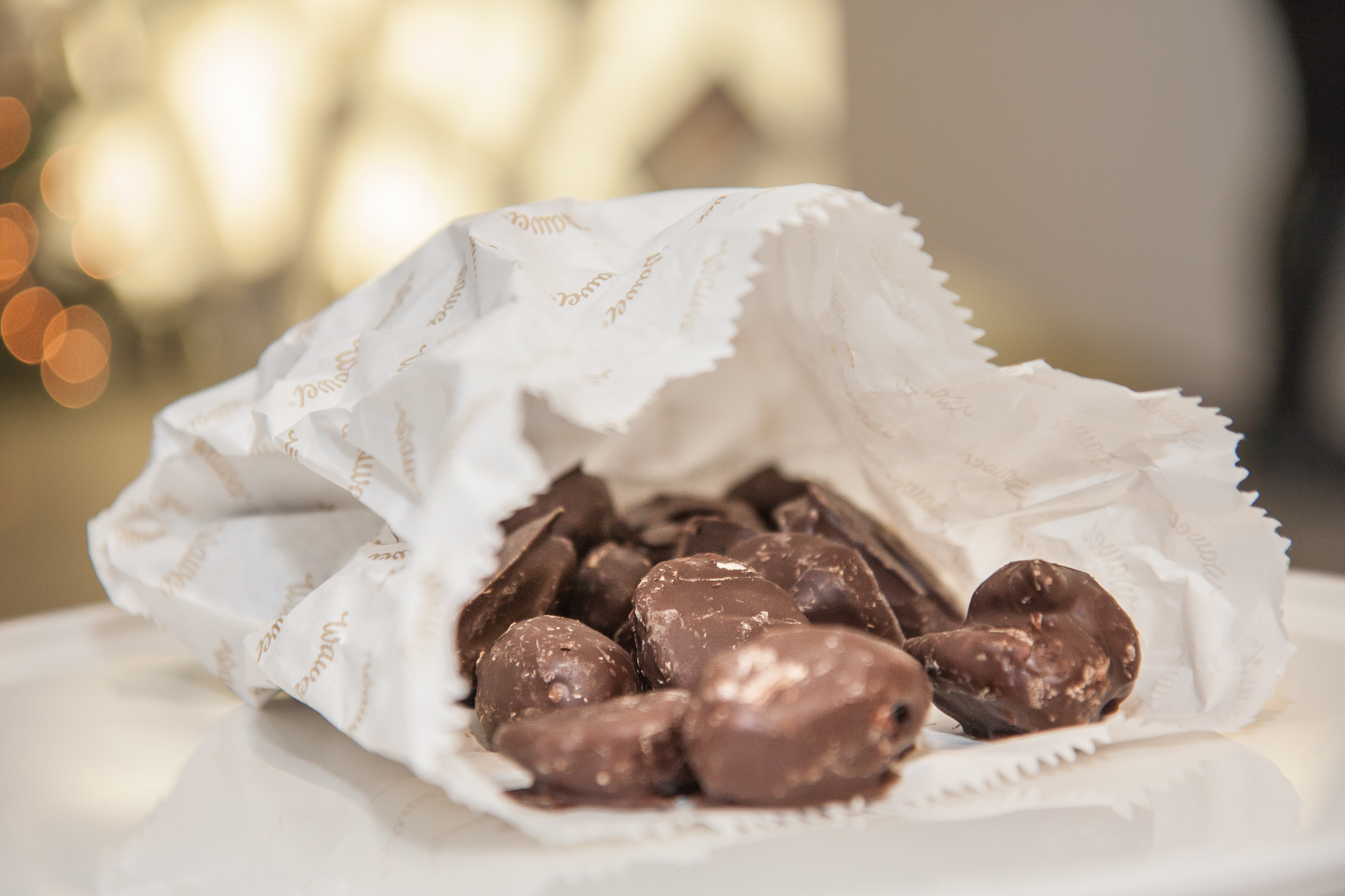
Plums in chocolate from Wawel

Chocolate-covered prunes, also known as plums in chocolate or prunes in chocolate (Polish: śliwka w czekoladzie, Russian: чернослив в шоколаде, romanized: chernosliv v shokolade), is a form of sweet: a chocolate candy with a prune (dried plum) as filling.

A chocolate-covered prune or plum is a typical Polish delicacy. Along with similarly prepared dried apricots, chocolate-covered prunes are a traditional confectionery in Russia and Ukraine.

== Variations ==
Chocolate-covered or chocolate-cream-covered cooked plums are variations of chocolate-covered prunes, sometimes with toasted almonds or walnuts at the center of the confection. Crushed nuts can be used as a topping.

== See also ==
- Chocolate-covered cherry
- Chocolate-covered raisins
- Chocolate-covered fruit
- List of chocolate-covered foods
- List of plum dishes
