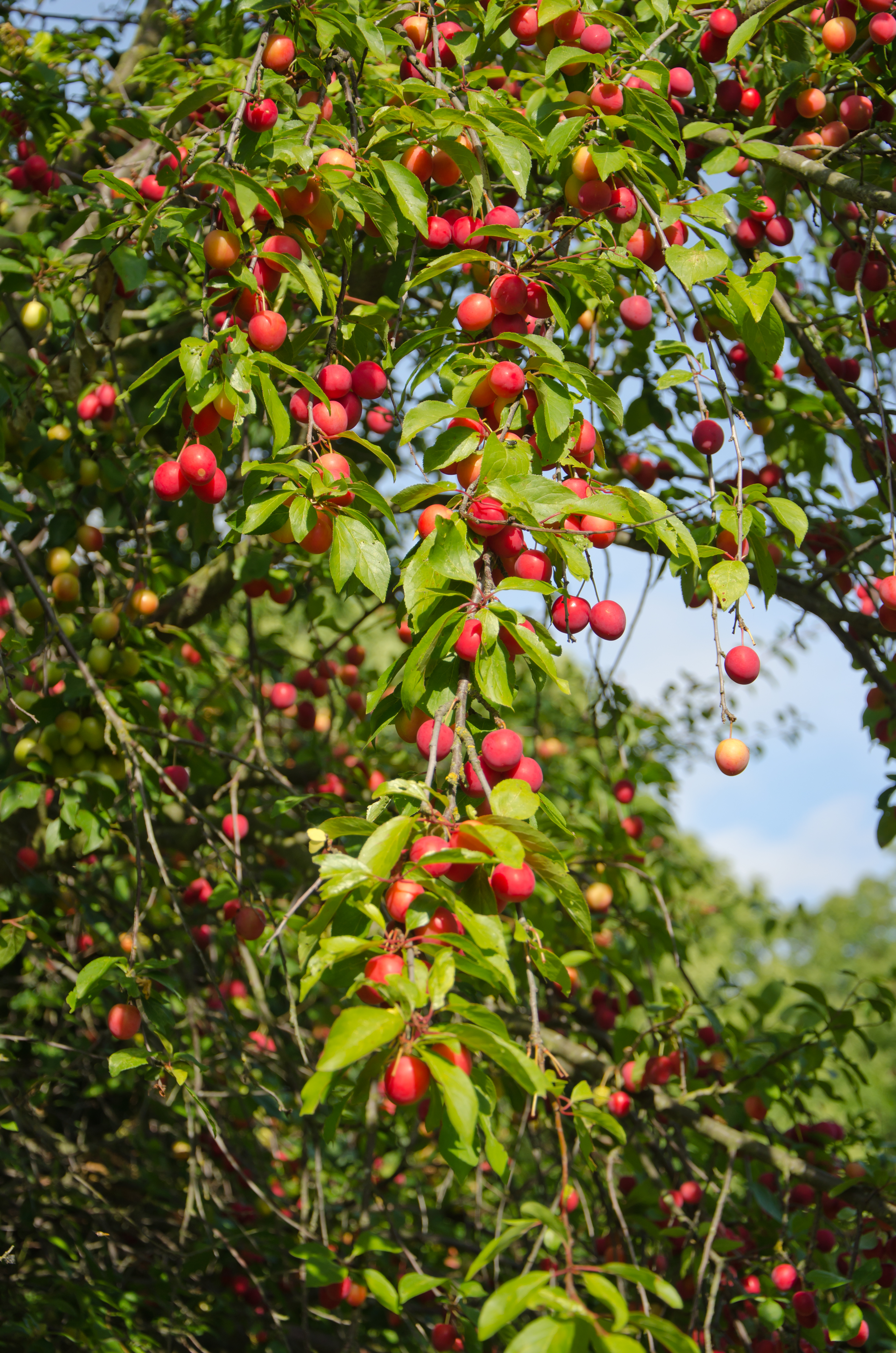

Conservation status
- Data Deficient (IUCN 3.1)

Scientific classification
- Kingdom: Plantae
- Clade: Tracheophytes
- Clade: Angiosperms
- Clade: Eudicots
- Clade: Rosids
- Order: Rosales
- Family: Rosaceae
- Genus: Prunus
- Subgenus: Prunus subg. Prunus
- Section: Prunus sect. Prunus
- Species: P. cerasifera

Binomial name
- Prunus cerasifera Ehrh. 1784 not Popov 1929 nor Lecoq & Lamotte 1848

Synonyms
- List: Selected synonyms; Prunus alpestris Schischk.; Prunus cerasifera subsp. myrobalana (L.) C.K.Schneid.; Prunus divaricata Ledeb.; Prunus domestica subsp. cerasifera (Ehrh.) Arcang.; Prunus domestica var. myrobalana L.; Prunus myrobalana (L.) Desf.; Prunus mirobalanus Poit. & Turpin; Prunus pissardii Carrière; Prunus sogdiana Vassilcz.

= Prunus cerasifera =

Species of plum

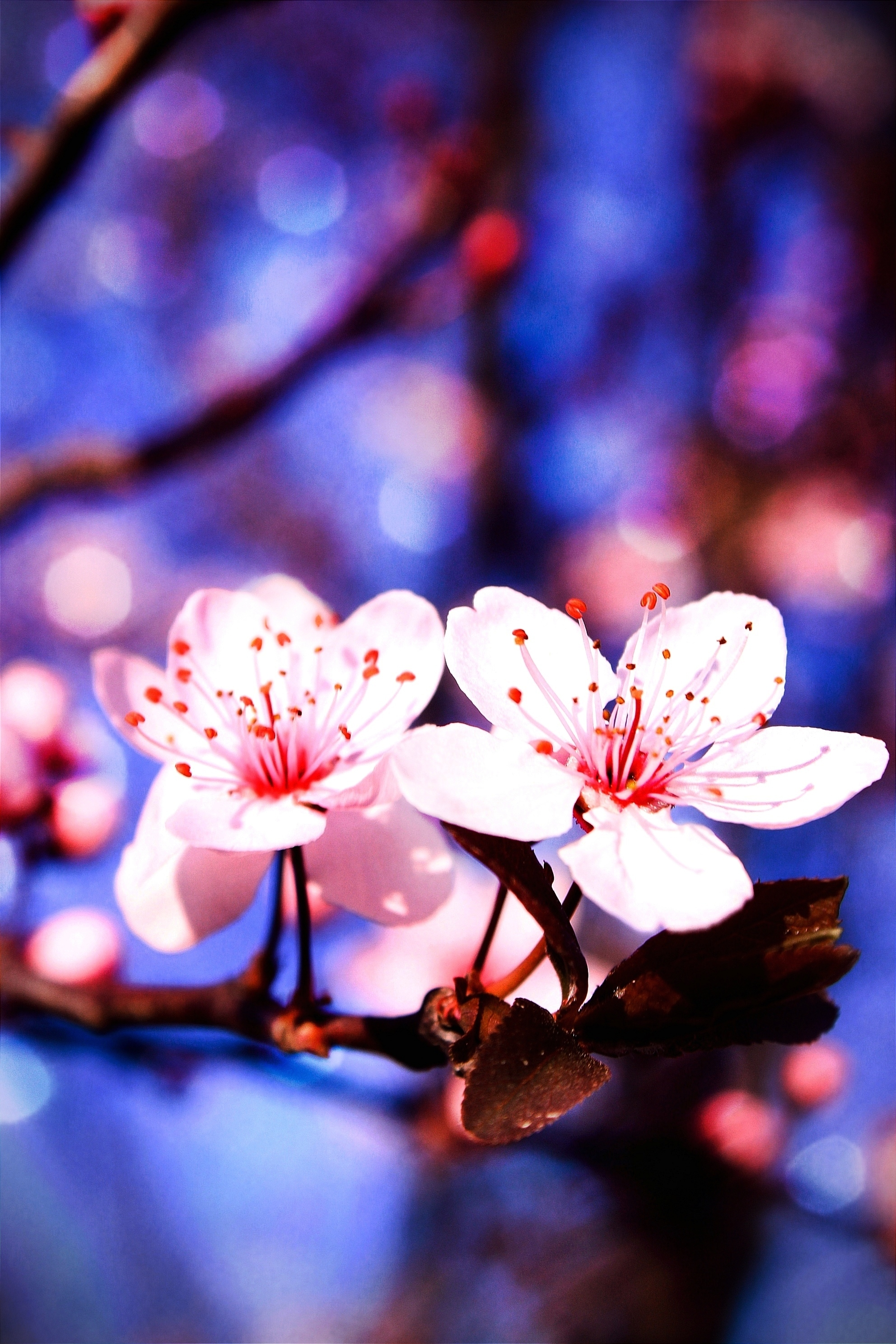
Prunus cerasifera

Prunus cerasifera is a species of plum known by the common names cherry plum and myrobalan plum. Native to Eurasia and naturalized elsewhere, P. cerasifera is believed to be one of the parents of the cultivated plum.

== Description ==
Wild types are large shrubs or small trees reaching 8–12 metres (26–39 ft) tall, sometimes spiny, with glabrous, ovate deciduous leaves 3–7 cm (1–3 in) long. It is one of the first European trees to flower in spring, often starting in mid-February before the leaves have opened. The flowers are white or pale pink and about 2 cm (3/4 in) across, with five petals and many stamens. The fruit is an edible drupe, 2–3 cm in diameter, ripening to yellow or red from early July to mid-September. They are self-fertile but can also be pollinated by other Prunus varieties such as the Victoria plum. The plant propagates by seed or by suckering, and is often used as the rootstock for other Prunus species and cultivars.

== Distribution and habitat ==
It is native to Southeast Europe and Western Asia, and is naturalised in the British Isles and scattered locations in North America. It is also naturalized in parts of Southeast Australia where it is considered to be a mildly invasive weed of bushland near urban centers.

== Ecology ==
P. cerasifera is believed to be one of the parents of the cultivated plum, Prunus domestica, perhaps crossing with the sloe, Prunus spinosa, or perhaps the sole parent. This would make it a parent of most of the commercial varieties of plum in the UK and mainland Europe: Victoria, greengages, bullace, etc.

== Cultivation ==
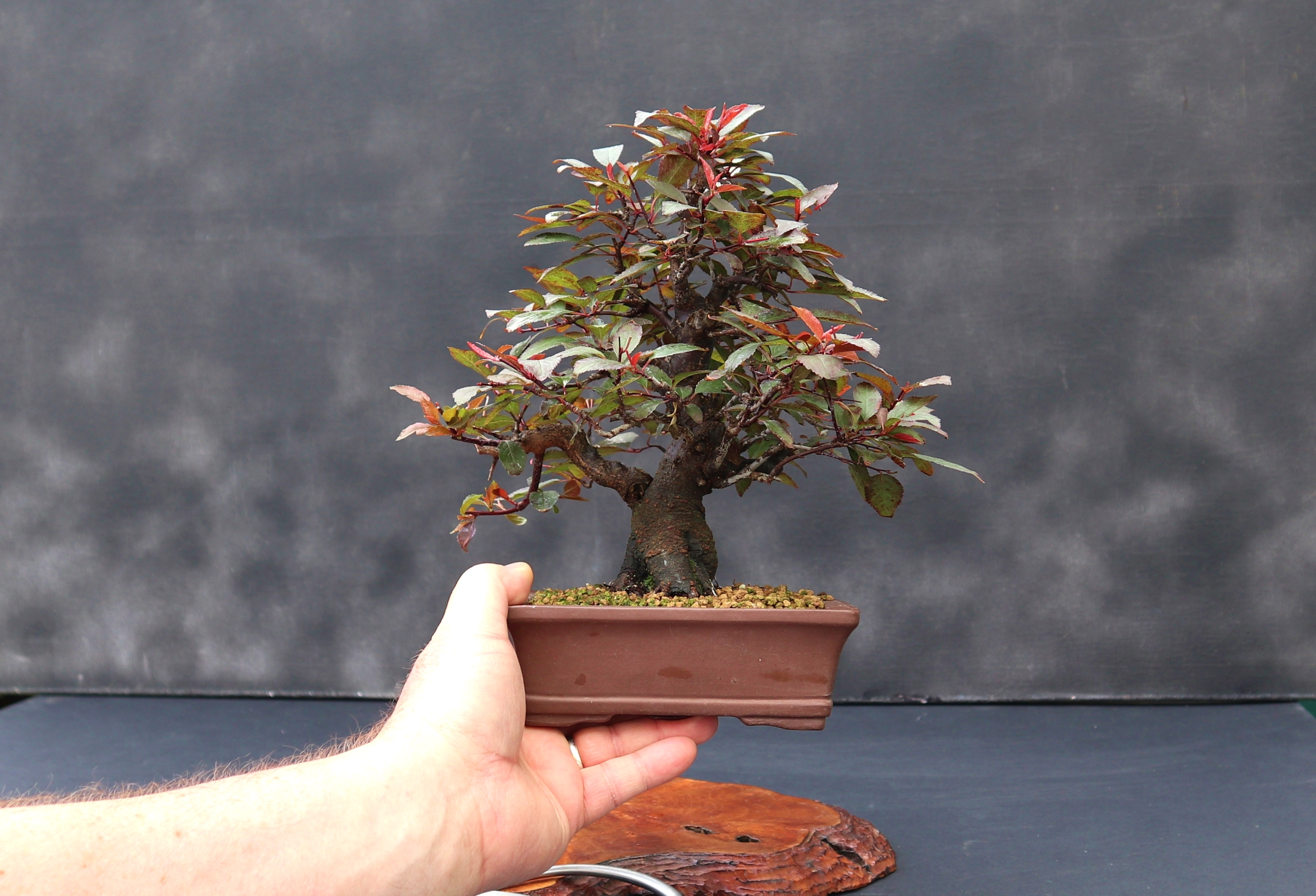
Bonsai (shohin size)

The cherry plum is a popular ornamental tree for garden and landscaping use, grown for its very early flowering. Numerous cultivars have been developed, many of them selected for purple foliage, such as P. cerasifera var pissardii (Carrière) L.H. Bailey (P. 'Atropurpurea'). The cultivar 'Nigra' with black foliage and pink flowers, has gained the Royal Horticultural Society's Award of Garden Merit. Prunus × cistena (purple leaf sand cherry), a hybrid of Prunus cerasifera and Prunus pumila, the sand cherry, also won the Award of Garden Merit. These purple-foliage forms (often called 'purple-leaf plum'), also have dark purple fruit, which make an attractive, intensely coloured jam. They can have white or pink flowers. The cultivar 'Thundercloud' has bright red foliage which darkens purple. Others, such as 'Lindsayae', have green foliage. Some kinds of purple-leaf plums are used for bonsai and other forms of living sculpture. Cultivated cherry plums can have fruits, foliage, and flowers in any of several colours.

== Uses ==
The fruits are edible. Some varieties have sweet fruits that can be eaten fresh, while others are sour and better for making jam. Cherry plums are a key ingredient in Georgian cuisine where they are used to produce tkemali sauce, as well as a number of popular dishes, such as kharcho soup and chakapuli stew. It is a popular tree in Romania where its fruits are used for souring soups when immature, for eating raw when ripened, and for making moonshine when overripe because of their high sugar content.

== Gallery ==
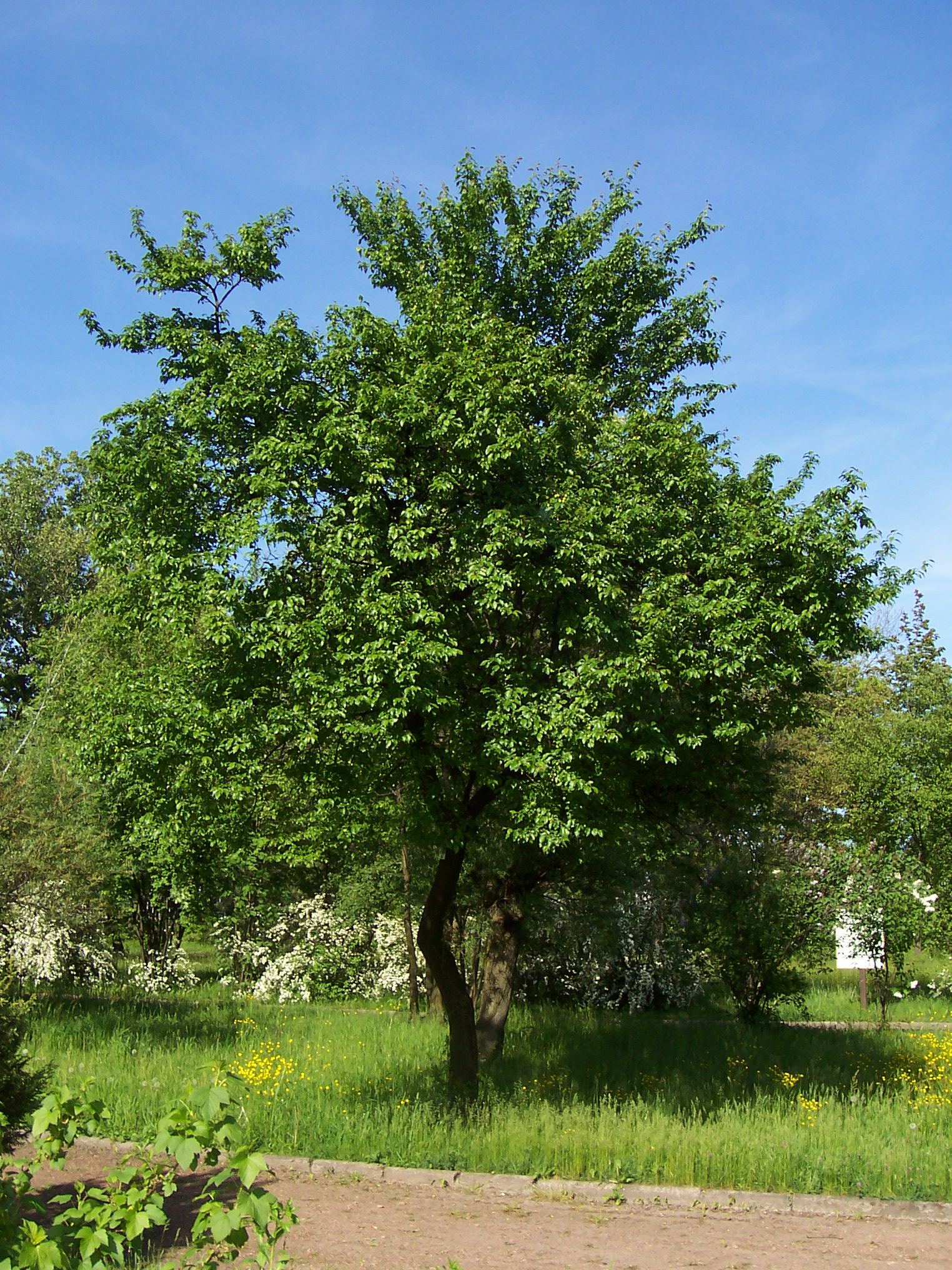
Prunus cerasifera

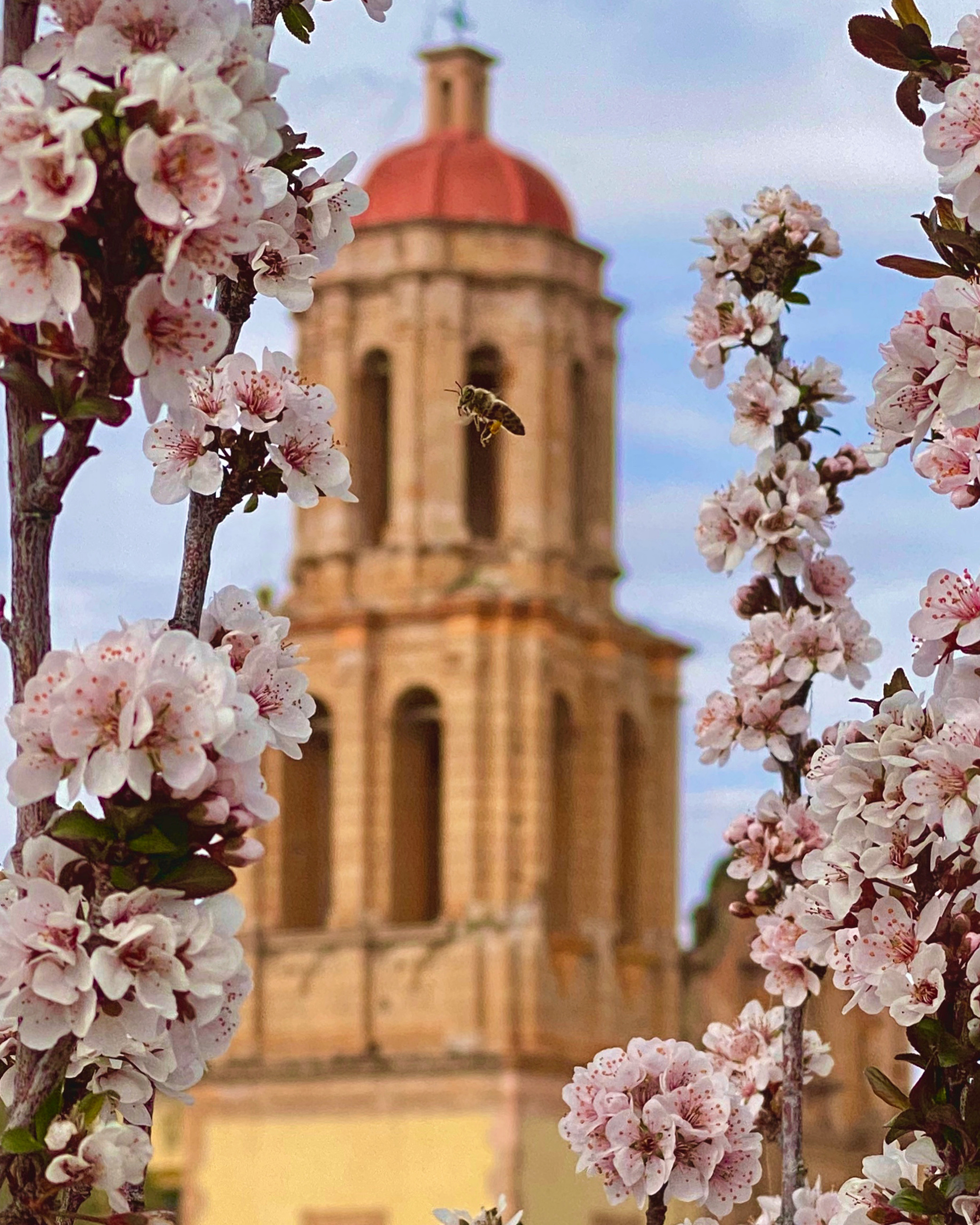
Flowers being pollinated

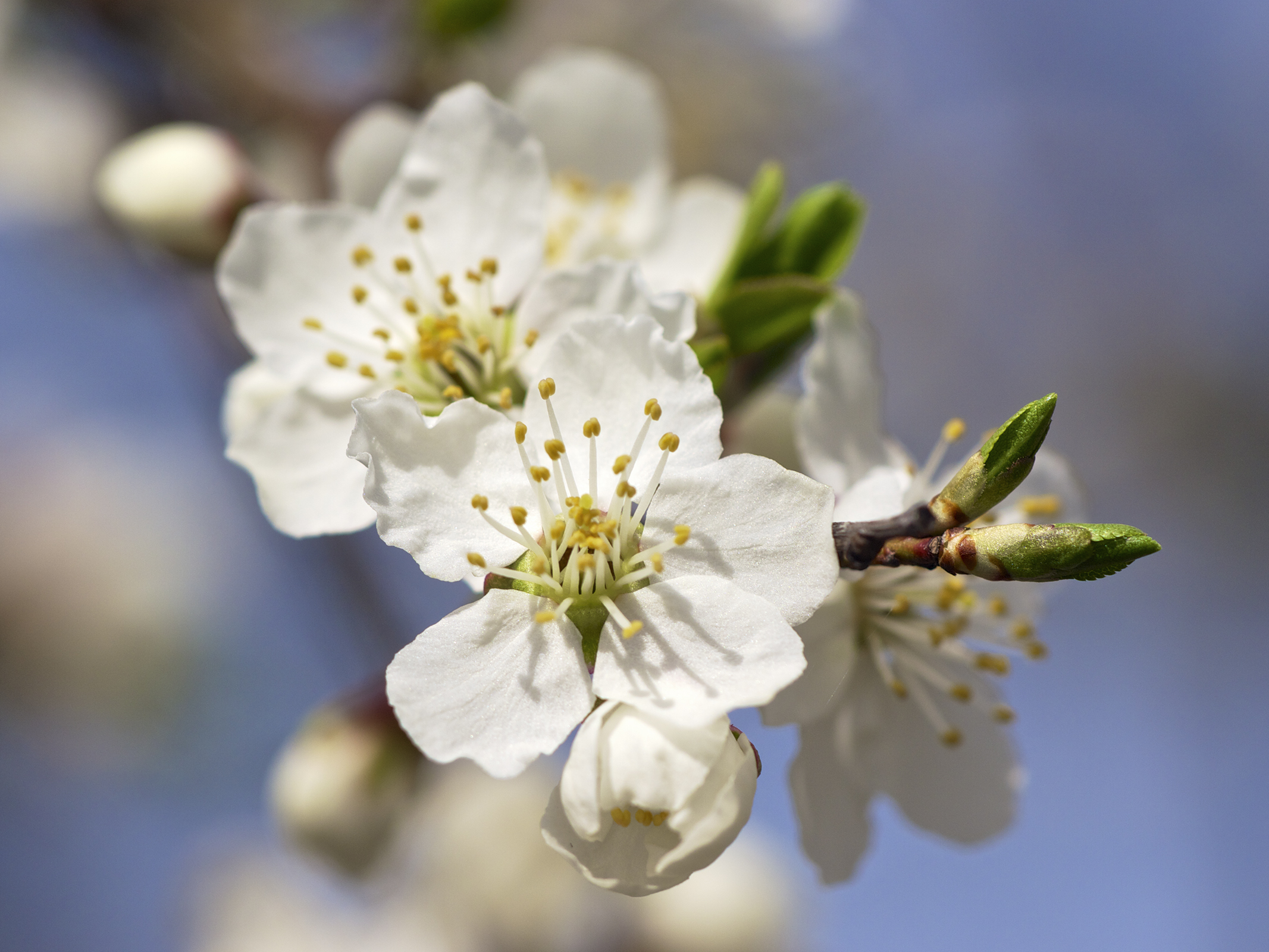
Flowers

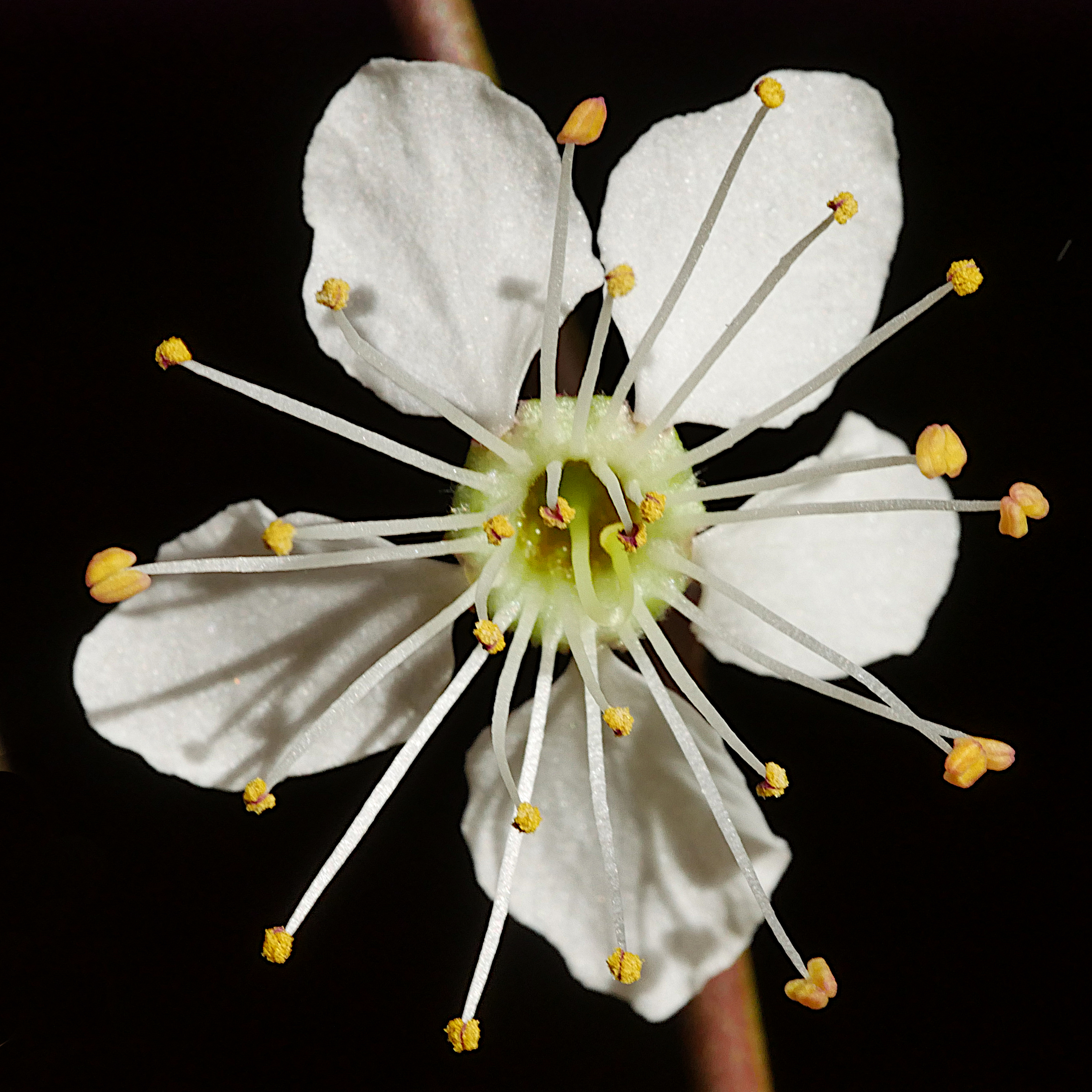
Flower (close-up)

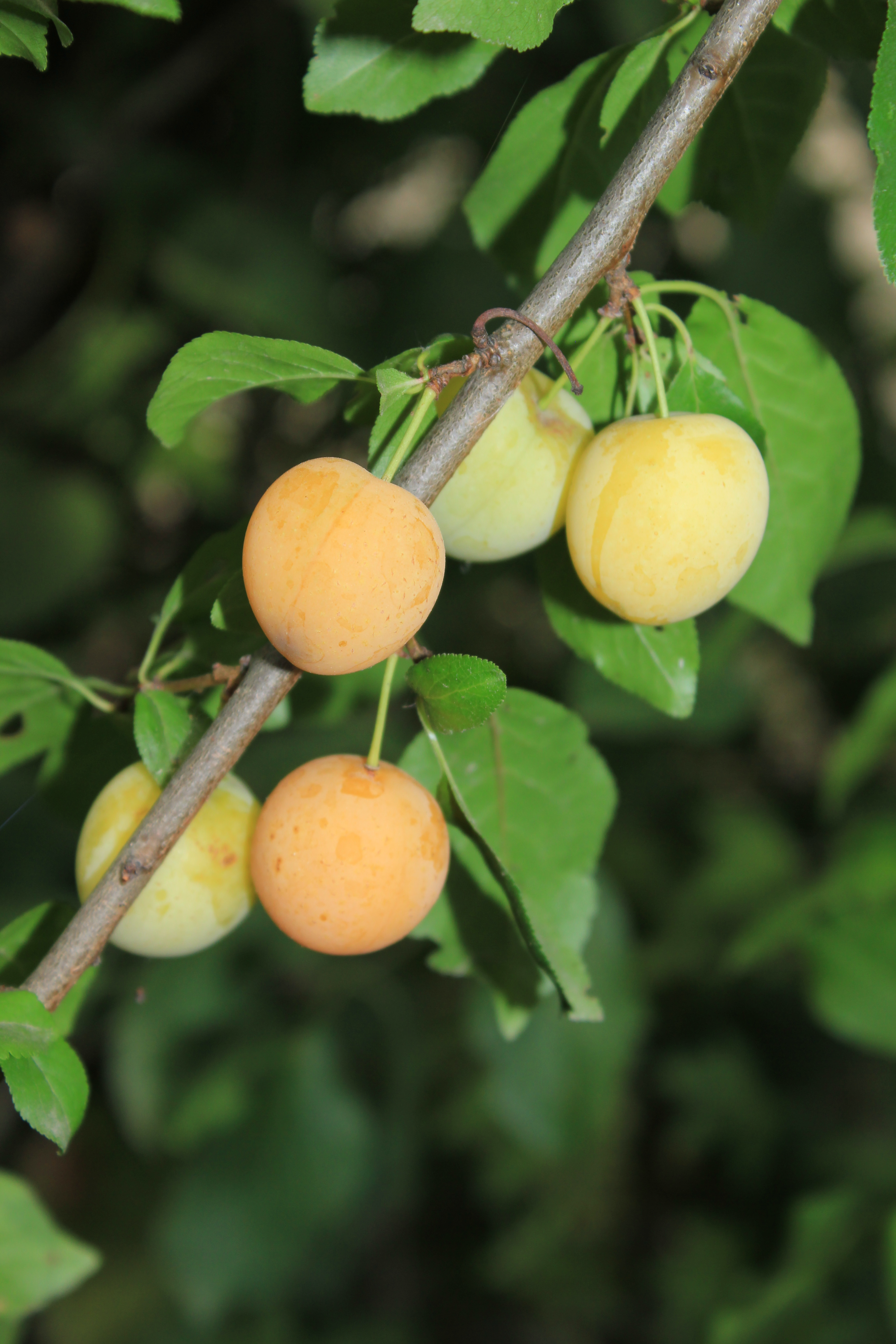
Ripened fruits on the branch

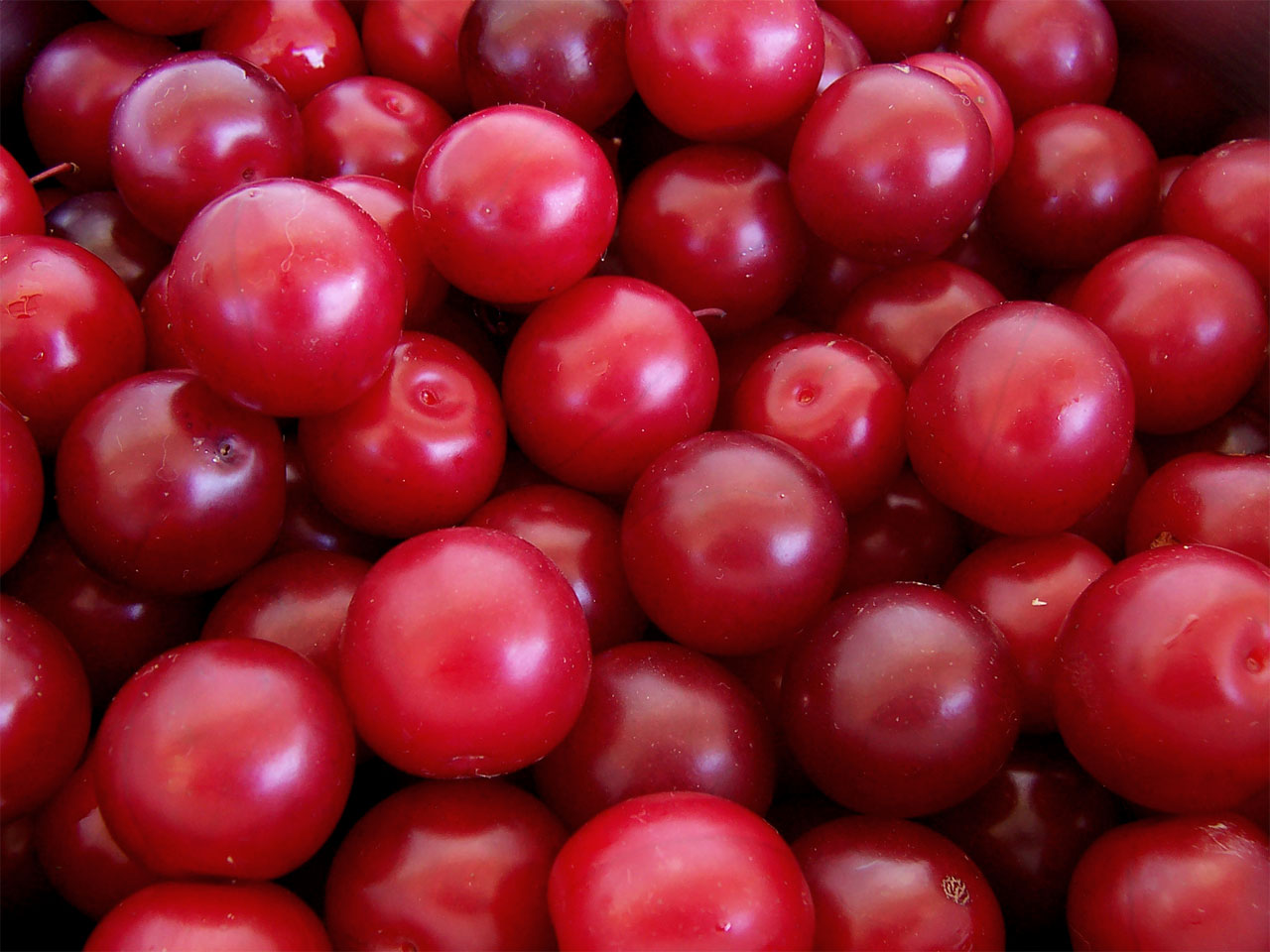
Ripened fruits

== See also ==
- Prunus mahaleb
- Cotoneaster nummularius
- Aria edulis
- Rosa canina
- Pyrus elaeagrifolia
- Malus sylvestris
- Crataegus monogyna
- List of plum dishes
