= Prune =

Dried plum

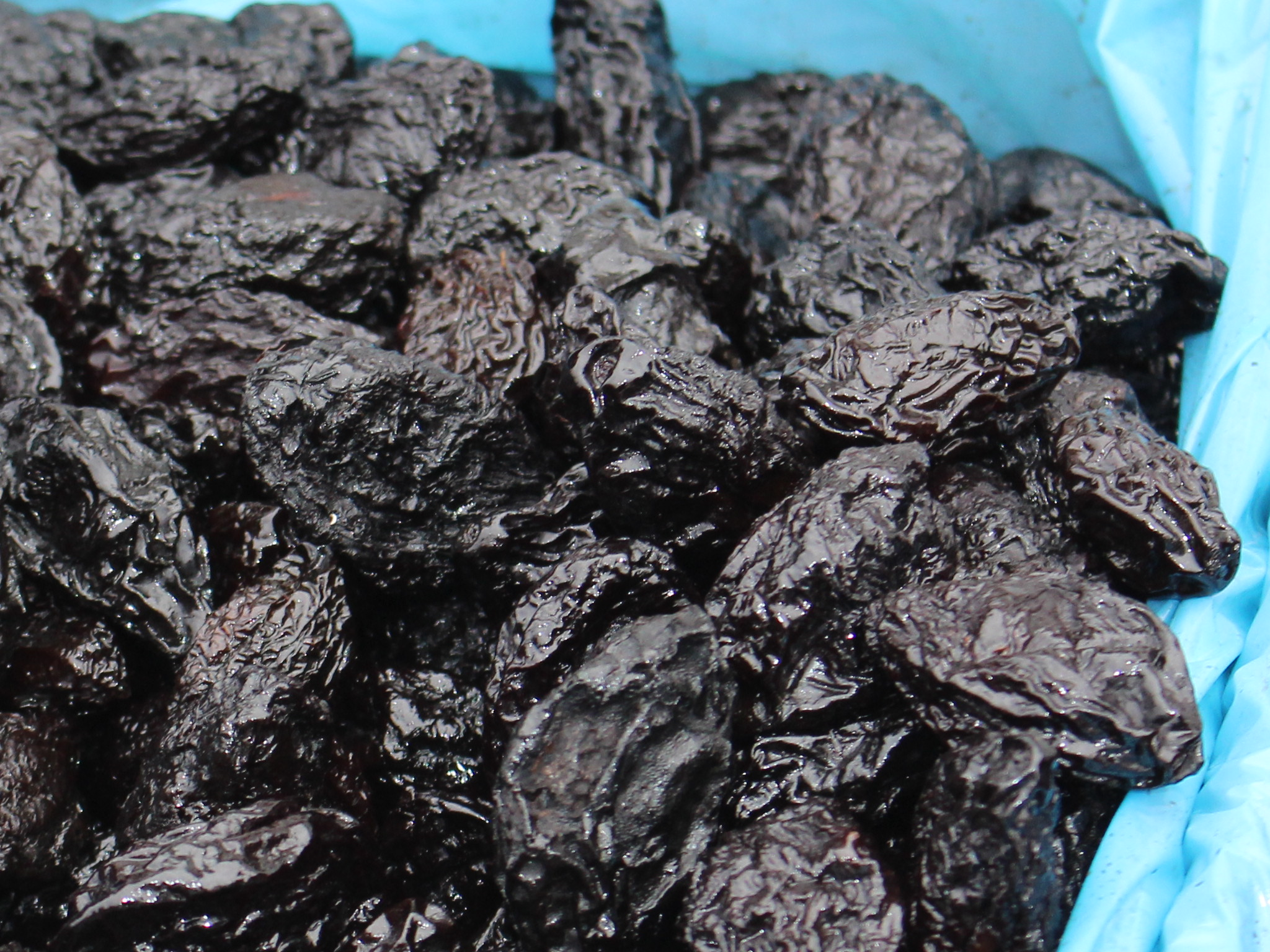
Dried plums (prunes)

A prune is a dried plum, most commonly from the European plum (Prunus domestica) tree. Not all plum species or varieties can be dried into prunes. Use of the term prune for fresh plums is obsolete except when applied to varieties of plum grown for drying. In this usage, a prune is the firm-fleshed plum fruit of P. domestica varieties that have a high soluble solids content and do not ferment during drying.

Most prunes are freestone cultivars (i.e., the pit is easy to remove), whereas most plums grown for fresh consumption are clingstone (the pit is more difficult to remove). The sorbitol content along with dietary fiber likely provide the laxative effect associated with consuming prunes. Prunes are 64% carbohydrates, including dietary fiber, 2% protein, a rich source of vitamin K, and a moderate source of B vitamins and dietary minerals.

== Production ==
More than 1,000 plum cultivars are grown for drying. The main cultivar grown in the United States is the 'Improved French' prune. Other varieties include 'Sutter', 'Tulare Giant', 'Moyer', 'Imperial', 'Italian', and greengages. Fresh prunes reach the market earlier than fresh plums and are usually smaller in size. The great majority of commercially grown prune varieties are self-fertile and do not need separate pollinator trees.

=== Name change ===
In 2001, plum growers in the United States were authorized by the Food and Drug Administration to call prunes "dried plums". Due to a perception that prunes relieve constipation (perceived as derogatory), some distributors stopped using the word "prune" on packaging labels in favor of "dried plums".

== Health effects ==
Dried plums (prunes), uncooked
Nutritional value per 100 g (3.5 oz)
- Energy: 1,006 kJ (240 kcal)
- Carbohydrates: 63.88 g
- Sugars: 38.13 g
- Dietary fiber: 7.1 g
- Fat: 0.38 g
- Protein: 2.18 g
Vitamins and minerals
| Vitamins | Quantity %DV^{†} |
| Vitamin A equiv. beta-Carotene lutein zeaxanthin | 4% 39 μg 4% 394 μg 148 μg |
| Thiamine (B1) | 4% 0.051 mg |
| Riboflavin (B2) | 14% 0.186 mg |
| Niacin (B3) | 12% 1.882 mg |
| Pantothenic acid (B5) | 8% 0.422 mg |
| Vitamin B6 | 12% 0.205 mg |
| Folate (B9) | 1% 4 μg |
| Choline | 2% 10.1 mg |
| Vitamin C | 1% 0.6 mg |
| Vitamin E | 3% 0.43 mg |
| Vitamin K | 50% 59.5 μg |
| Minerals | Quantity %DV^{†} |
| Calcium | 3% 43 mg |
| Copper | 31% 0.281 mg |
| Iron | 5% 0.93 mg |
| Magnesium | 10% 41 mg |
| Manganese | 13% 0.299 mg |
| Phosphorus | 6% 69 mg |
| Potassium | 24% 732 mg |
| Sodium | 0% 2 mg |
| Zinc | 4% 0.44 mg |
- Other constituents: Quantity
- Water: 31 g
- Link to USDA Database entry
- ^{†}Percentages estimated using US recommendations for adults, except for potassium, which is estimated based on expert recommendation from the National Academies.

Prunes contain dietary fiber (about 7% of weight) which may provide laxative effects, but prune juice also has a laxative effect without containing fiber. Their sorbitol content (14.7 and 6.1 g/100 g, for dried fruit and juice respectively) may also be responsible for this, a conclusion reached in a 2012 review by the European Food Safety Authority (EFSA). Neochlorogenic acid and chlorogenic acid may also contribute to the laxative effect.

The EFSA report also demonstrated that prunes effectively contribute to the maintenance of normal bowel function in the general population if consumed in quantities of at least 100 grams (3.5 oz) per day.

=== Nutrition ===
Prunes are 31% water, 64% carbohydrates, 2% protein, and less than 1% fat (table). In a reference amount of 100 g (3.5 oz), prunes supply 240 calories, 7 grams of dietary fiber, and are a rich source of vitamin K (50% of the Daily Value, DV), copper (31% DV), and potassium (24% DV), with several B vitamins (12-14% DV) and other dietary minerals in moderate content (10–13% DV) (table).

=== Phytochemicals ===
Prunes and prune juice contain phytochemicals, including phenolic compounds (mainly as neochlorogenic acids and chlorogenic acids) and sorbitol.

== Uses ==
Prunes are used in preparing both sweet and savory dishes.

Contrary to the name, boiled plums or prunes are not used to make sugar plums, which instead may be nuts, seeds, or spices coated with hard sugar, also called comfits.

== Gallery ==
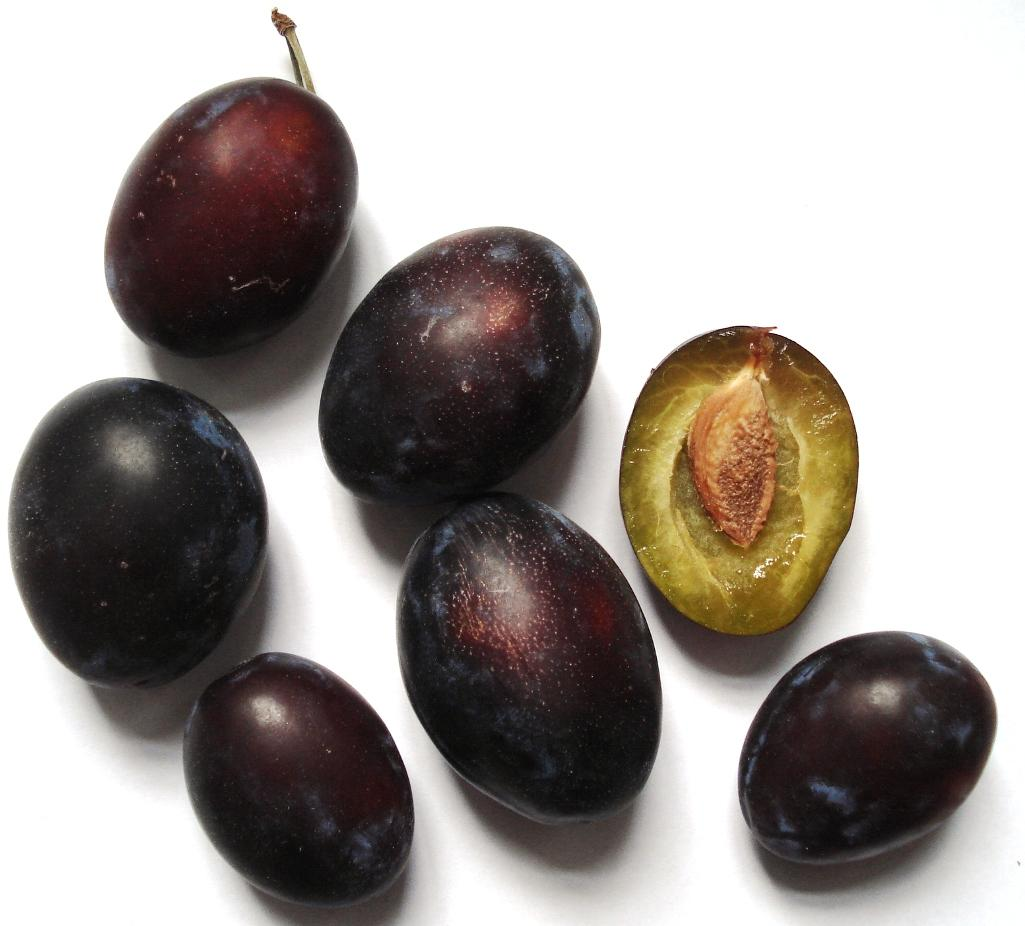
Raw plums that have not been dried into prunes

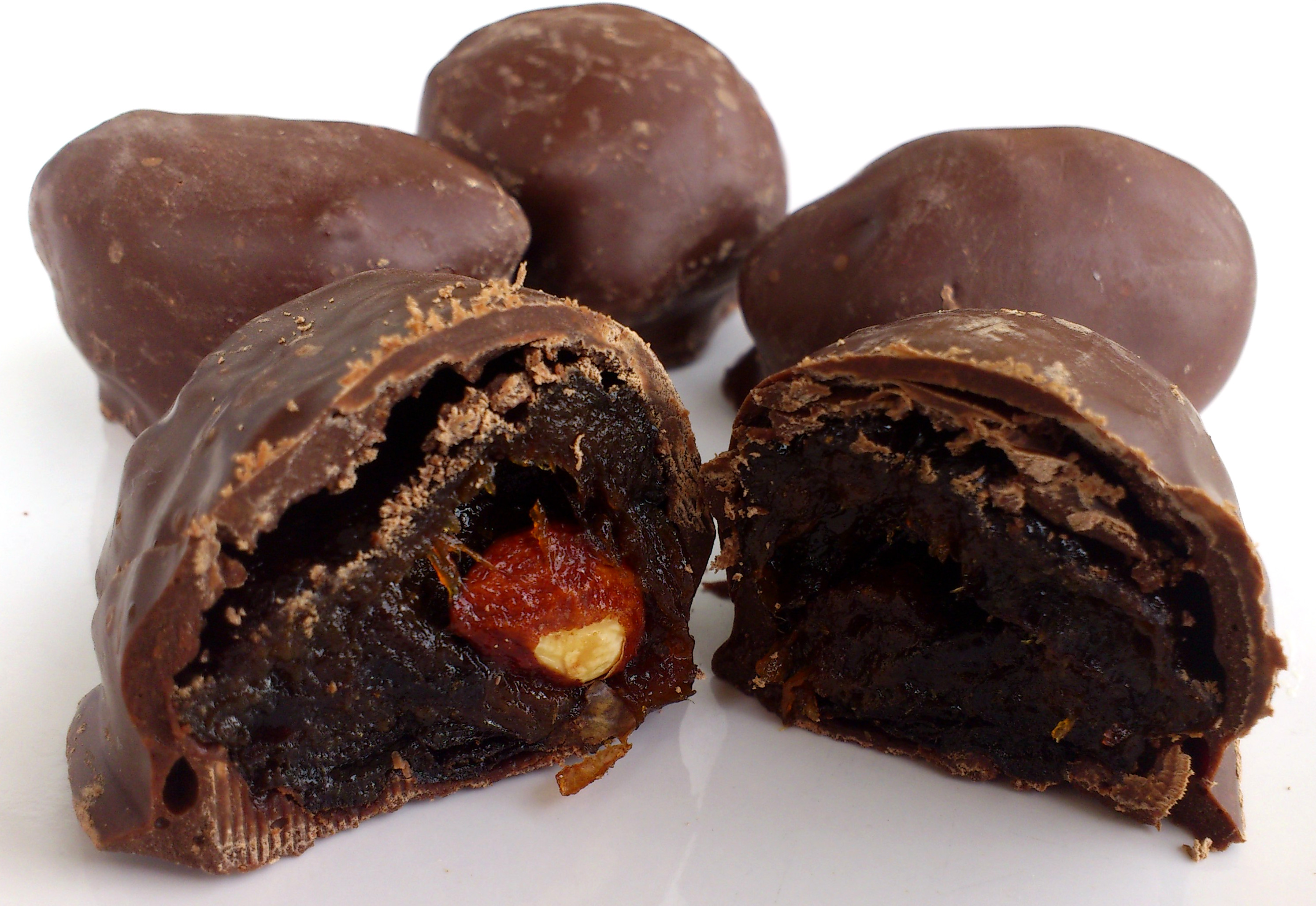
Prunes in chocolate with an almond in the middle

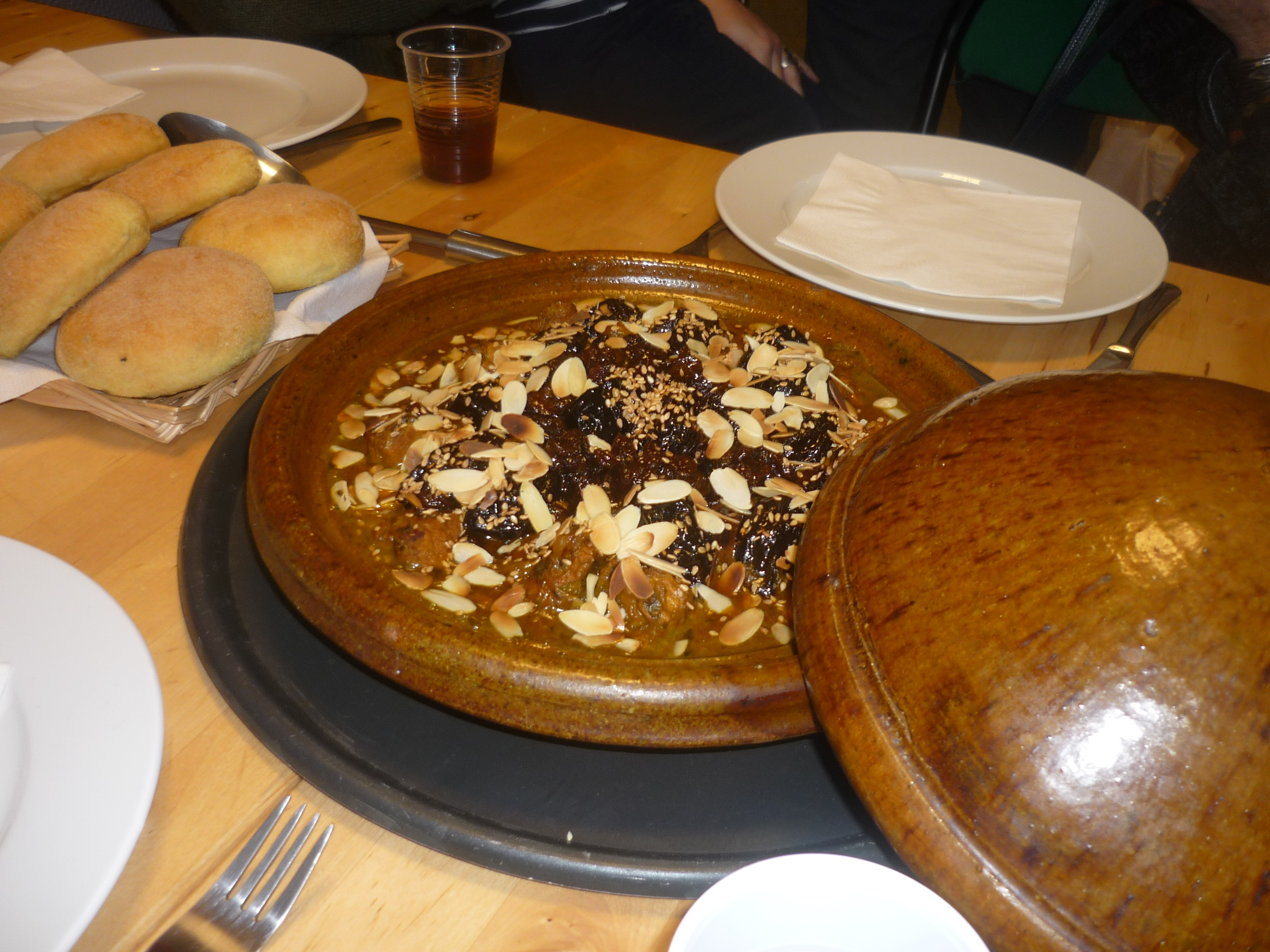
Moroccan-style tagine of lamb with prunes and almonds

== See also ==
- List of dried foods
- List of plum dishes
- Pomology – Study of fruits and their cultivation
