= Slivovitz =

Slavic fruit brandy

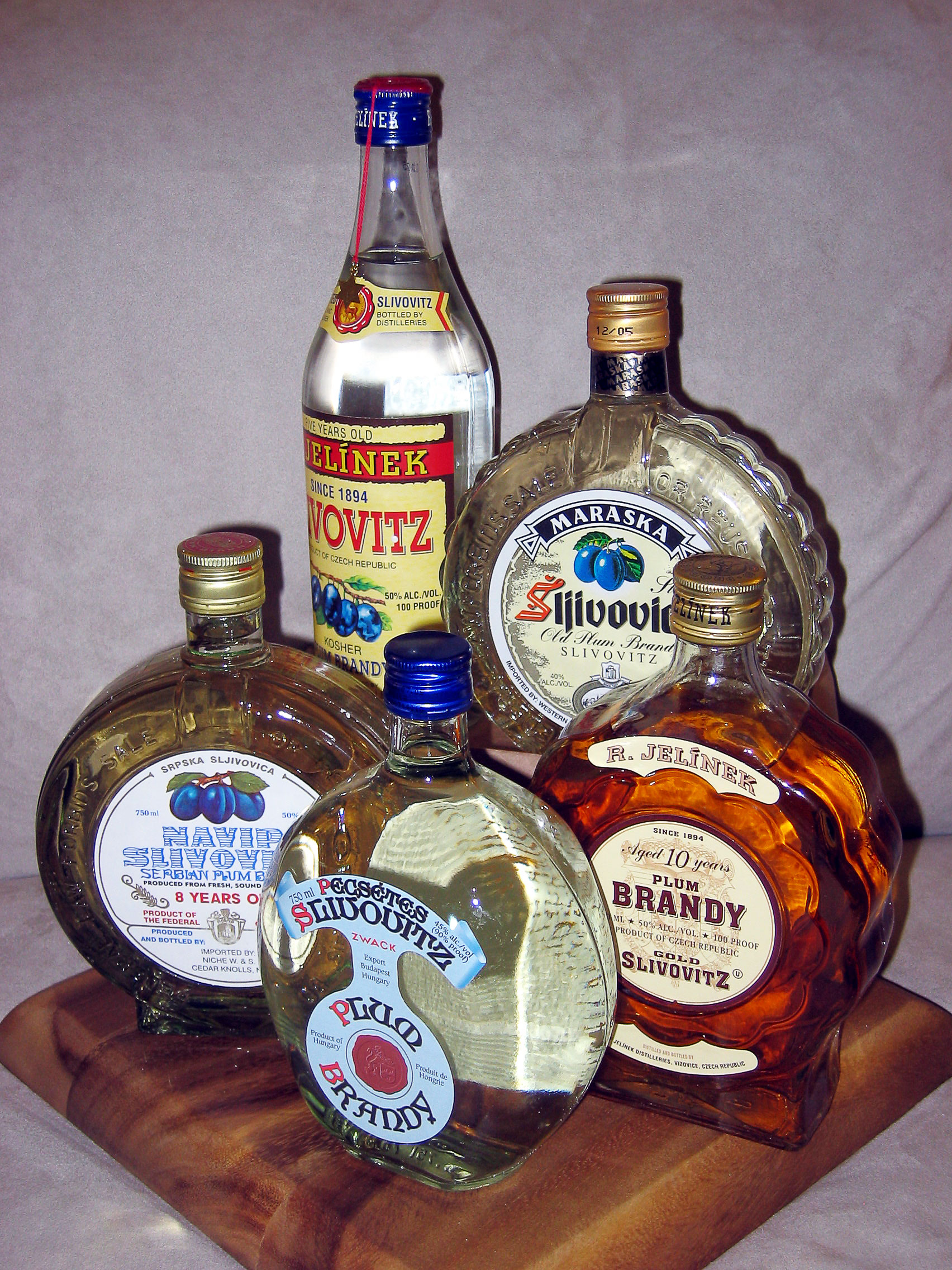
- Slivovitz from (clockwise) Croatia, the Czech Republic, Hungary and Serbia
- Type: Distilled beverage
- Origin: Slavic-speaking Central Europe and Balkans
- Introduced: 14th–15th century
- Alcohol by volume: 40–70%
- Proof (US): 80–140°
- Colour: Clear, pale yellow
- Ingredients: damsons
- Related products: Plum jerkum, damson gin, damassine, țuică, Pálinka, Palenka

Social practices and knowledge related to the preparation and use of the traditional plum spirit – šljivovica
- UNESCO Intangible Cultural Heritage
- Country: Serbia
- Reference: 01882
- Region: Europe and North America

Inscription history
- Inscription: 2022 (17th session)
- List: Representative

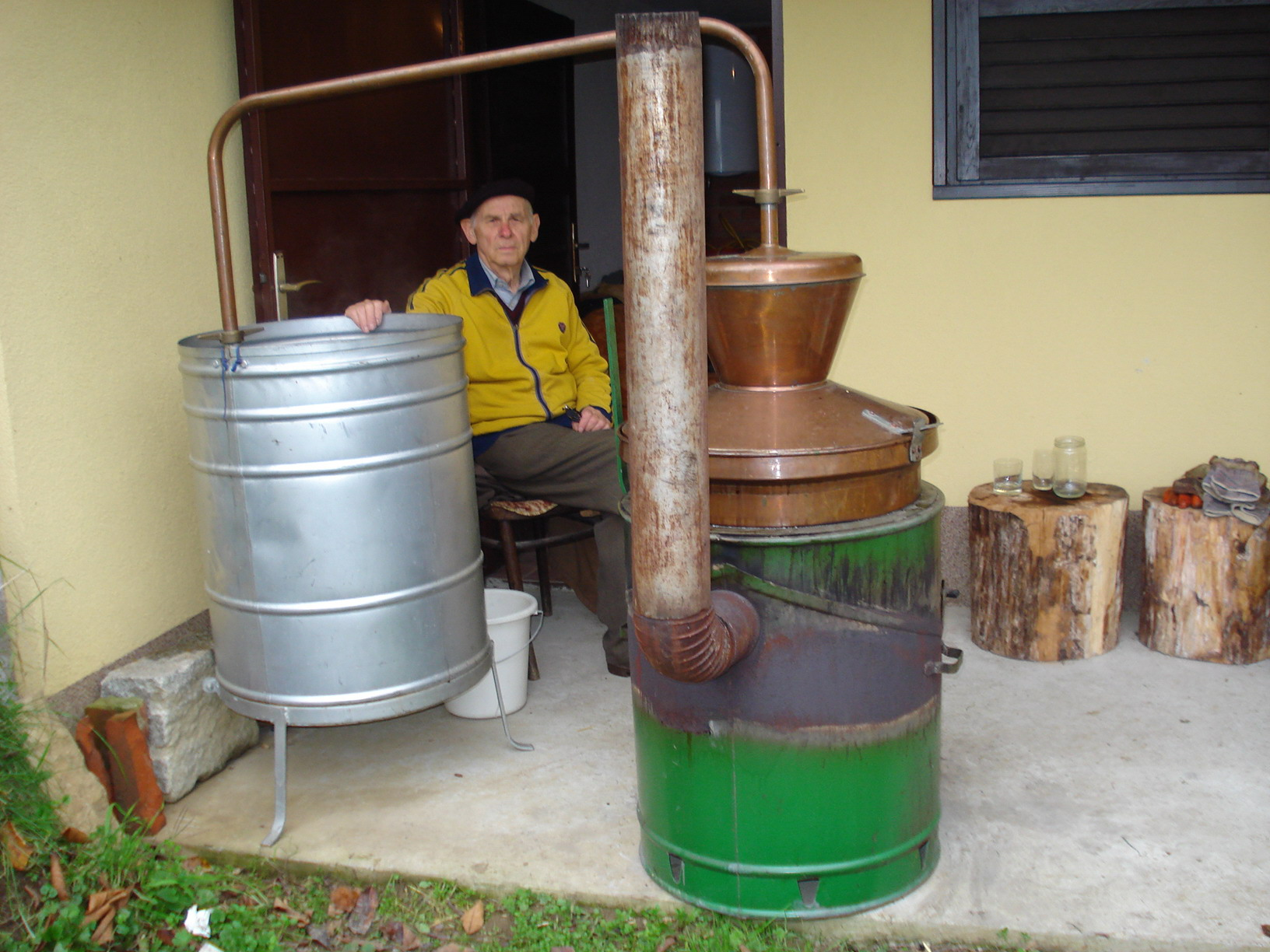
Traditional distilling process in Međimurje (northern Croatia)

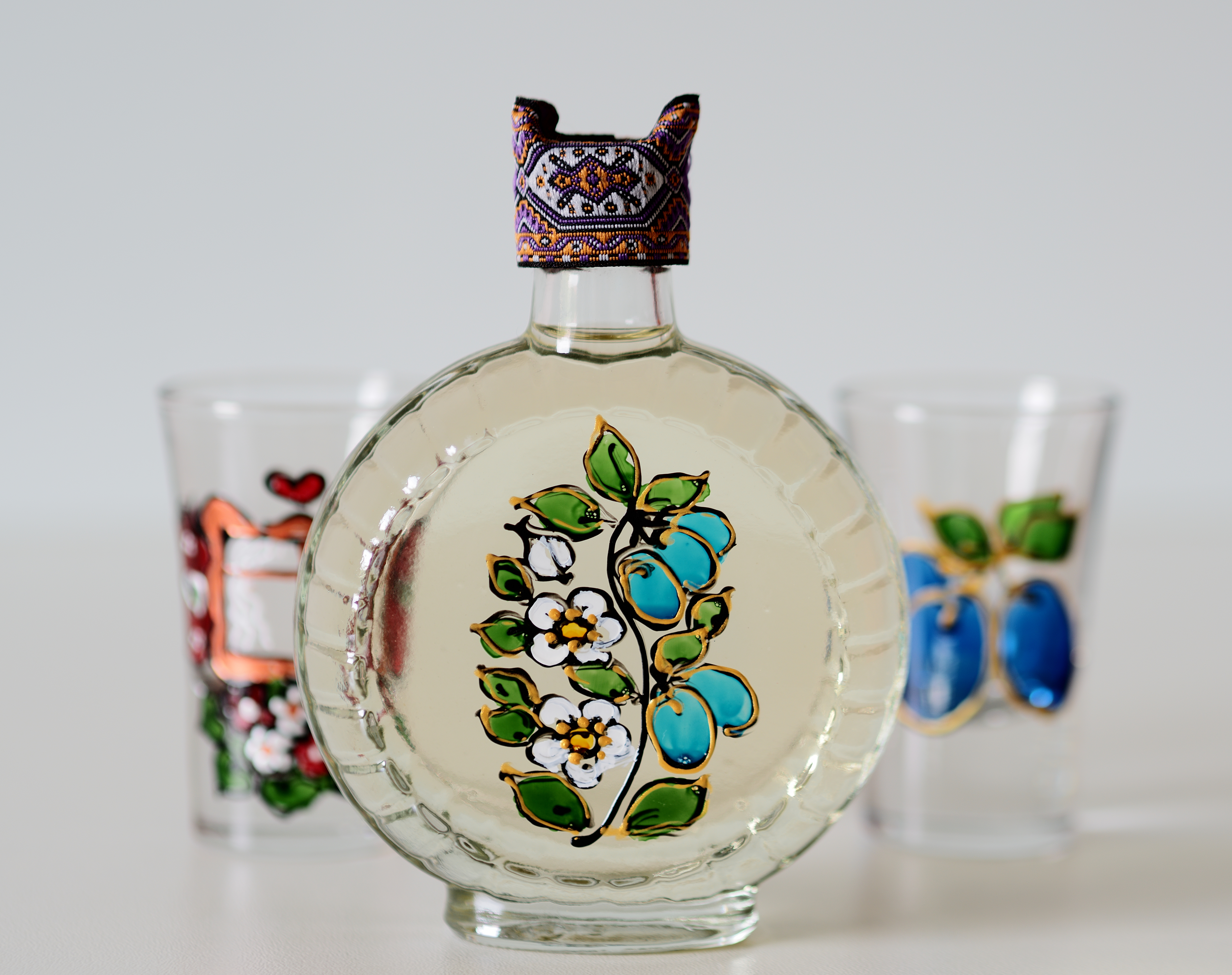
Serbian Slivovitz from Valjevo region

Slivovitz is a fruit spirit (or fruit brandy) made from damson plums, often referred to as plum spirit (or plum brandy). Slivovitz is produced in Central and Southeastern Europe, both commercially and privately. Primary producers include Bosnia and Herzegovina, Bulgaria, Croatia, the Czech Republic, Greece, Hungary, North Macedonia, Poland, Romania, Serbia, Slovakia, Slovenia, and Ukraine. In the Balkans, slivovitz is considered a kind of rakia. In Hungary it is considered a kind of pálinka, but in Romania and Moldova it is considered pălincă, similar to țuică. In the Czech Republic, Slovakia, Galicia, and Carpathian-Ruthenia it is considered pálenka. UNESCO put it in a UNESCO Intangible Cultural Heritage Lists in 2022 on request of the country of geographic origin Serbia.

== Etymology ==
The word slivovitz derives from Proto-Slavic *sliva 'plum' (Bulgarian: слива, Czech: švestka or slíva, Polish: śliwka, Serbo-Croatian: šljiva/шљива, or Slovak: slivka) with the diminutive suffix *-ica (/-ɪtsa/; -ice in Czech). Distilled spirits from different fruits are named similarly. For example, Czech meruňka 'apricot' → meruňkovice 'apricot spirit'; broskev 'peach' → broskvovice 'peach spirit'. Other names include slivovitza, slivovitsa, șliboviță, šljivovica, śliwowica, Schlivowitz, slivovice, slivovica, and slivovka.

== Production and consumption ==
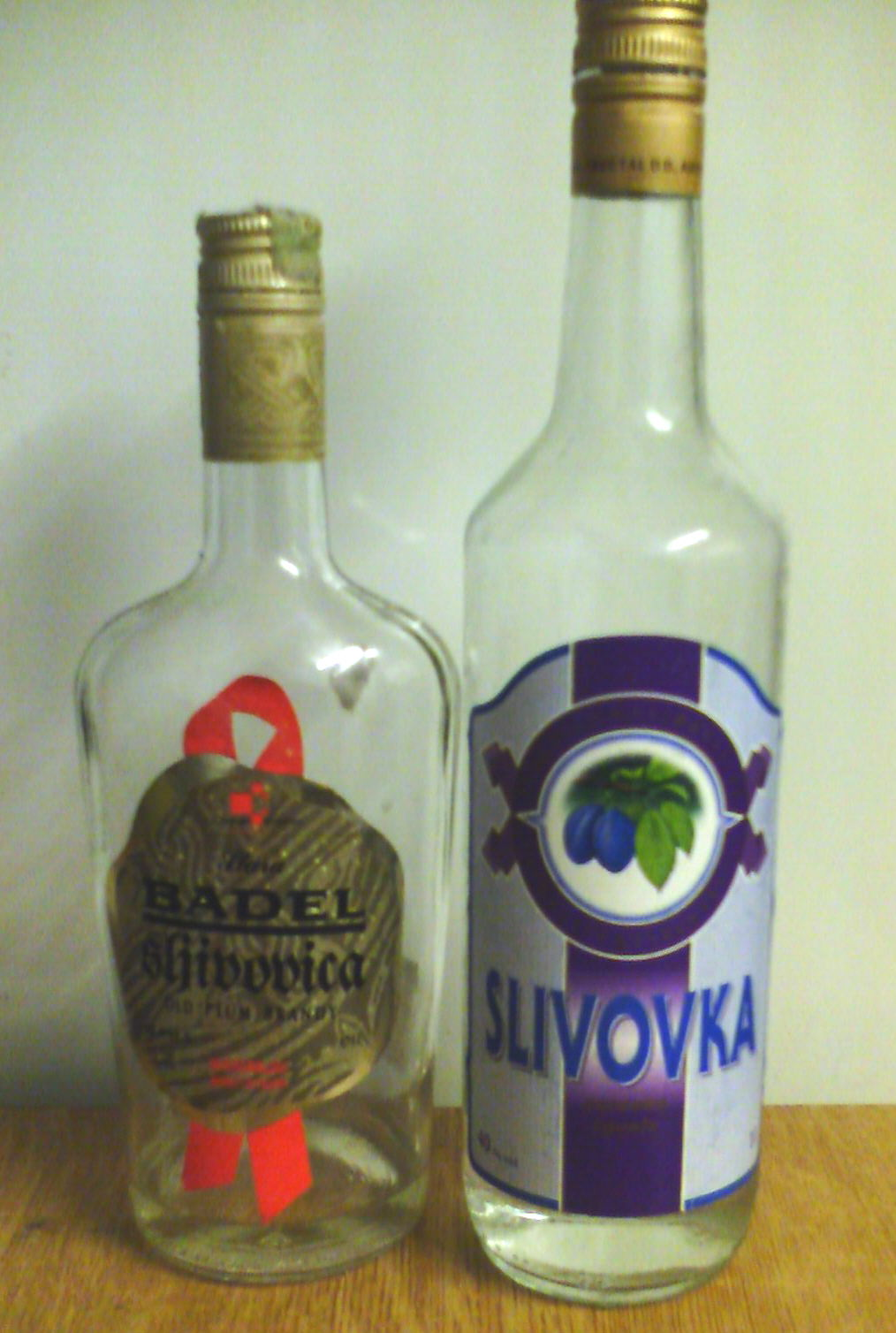
Croatian Šljivovica and Slovenian Slivovka, two different names for the same drink

The primary producers are Bosnia, Bulgaria, Croatia, Czech Republic, Hungary, Poland, Romania, Serbia, and Slovakia.

=== Regional names ===
Following the claims of several nations to the protected designation of origin, in October 2007 the European Union went for a compromise solution, leaving "slivovitz" as a generic name, and granting individual nations the right to protect the origin with their own adjective.

In respective languages, slivovitz (/ˈslɪvəvɪts/) is known as: Bulgarian: сливова, сливовица; Czech: slivovice; Dutch: Slivovits,German: Sliwowitz, Slibowitz; Hungarian: sligovica; Italian: slivovitz; Macedonian: сливова; Polish: śliwowica; Romanian: şliboviţă; Russian: сливовица; Serbo-Croatian: šljivovica, шљивовица; Slovak: slivovica; Slovene: slivovka; Ukrainian: слив'янка; and Yiddish: שליוואָוויץ.

Identical or similar spirits are also produced in Austria, Canada, France, Germany, Switzerland, the United States, and regional names include generic plum spirit, Pflümli, Damassine or eau-de-vie de quetsche.

=== Distilling process ===
Only Damson plums may be used as the base fruit for distillation. Before the production process, the plums may be slightly pressed or otherwise disrupted to speed up the fermentation process, but without damaging their ground kernels; yeast, starch, and sugar may be added to the juice. The mixture is then allowed to ferment. There may be one or more distillation stages, depending on the desired final product or region of production, and aging is common to enhance the distillate's finer flavours.

Some producers have obtained a Hechsher certifying that it is kosher for Passover, and thus suitable for consumption during the festival when grain-based liquors are forbidden.

Some modern production techniques, such as those used by Clear Creek in Oregon, omit the use of the pits in fermentation to create a less acerbic or bitter taste.

Imitation slivovitz is made by flavouring spirits with prune juice and artificial oil of bitter almonds.

== History, by country ==
=== Bulgaria ===
In Bulgaria, the "Troyan plum spirit" (Troyanska Slivova) has been distilled in the Troyan Monastery by the monks since the founding of the monastery in the 14th century. The original recipe included 40 herbs, and was passed through the centuries from abbot to abbot. In 1894, the Monastery's spirit was presented at a spirits competition in Antwerp, Belgium, where it won a bronze medal. Some of its distinguishing characteristics include that it is made of a plum variety that only grows in the Troyan region, an old variety the locals call "Madzharkini plums", very juicy and aromatic whose stone, unlike the Teteven plums, is easily removed from the fruit; it is distilled in a vessel with a capacity of 80 to 120 litres; and only the best of the harvest is distilled. It is considered best distilled to an alcohol level between 39 and 41 degrees. Some celebrities who have tasted Troyan plum spirit are Pope John Paul II and former US President Bill Clinton. Patriarch Maxim of Bulgaria celebrated his 95th birthday in 2009 in the Sofia Metropolitanate with Troyan plum spirit.

In 2007, in cooperation with the Bulgarian government, the Czech distillery Rudolf Jelinek protected the brands "Troyanska slivova" and "Tetevenska slivova" in the EU. That same year, this distillery, the largest European manufacturer of fruit distillates, bought a majority share in the largest Bulgarian slivovitsa vinery "Vinprom-Troyan", after having bought, half a year earlier, the second largest "Destila Teteven". However, the Czechs reduced the alcohol content to pay less duty. The production of "Vinprom-Troyan" is mainly for export. For the past 18 years, Troyan has had a special holiday: The Festival of Plum. This holiday is celebrated at the end of September in Troyan and in the village of Oreshak, where the Troyan Monastery is located. The plum has always been an essential produce in this region. Since the beginning of the 20th century, plums have been made into marmalades, pesto, dried prunes, and pulps, all of which were exported into Western Europe.

=== Czech Republic and Slovakia ===
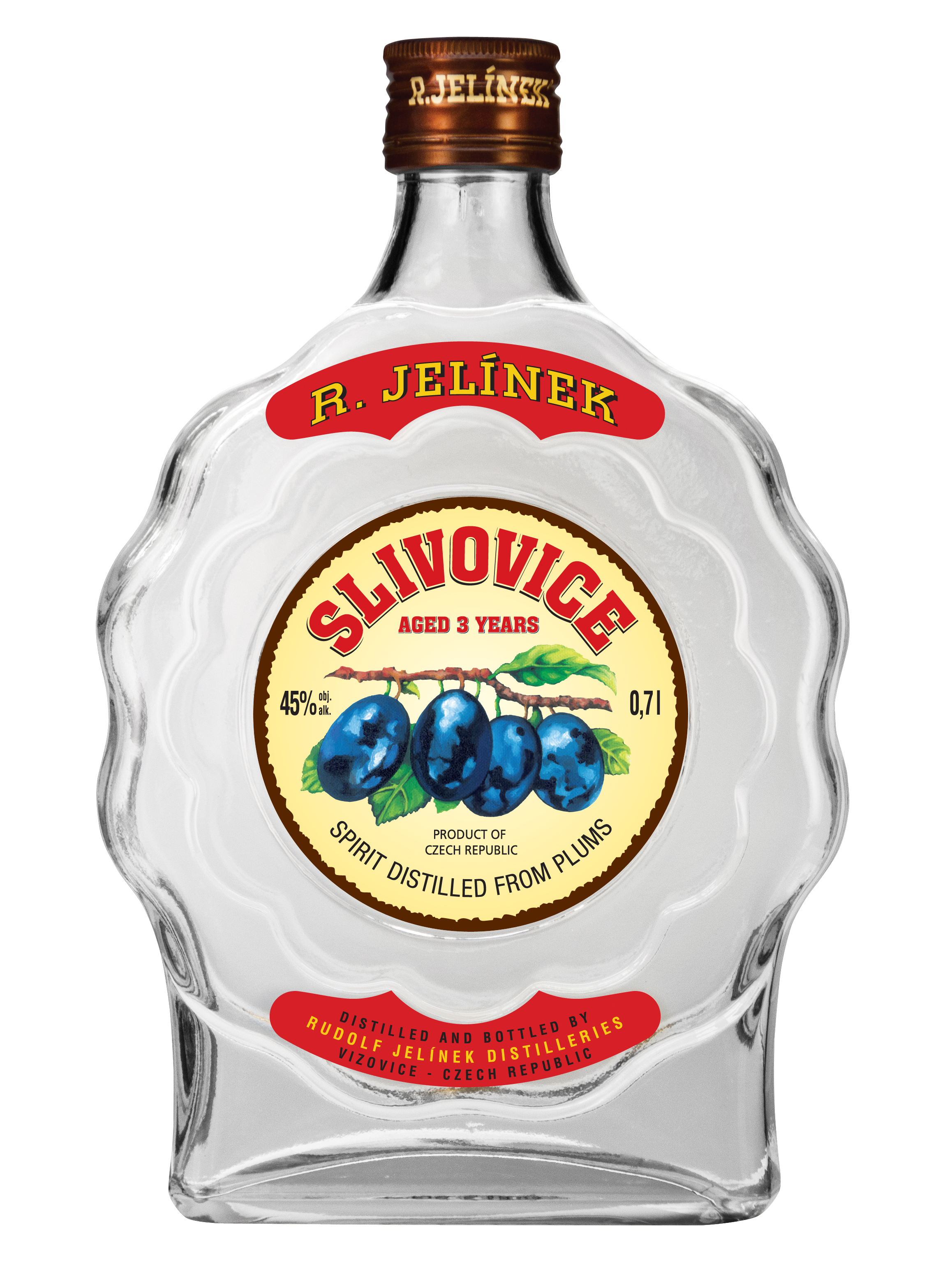
Moravian Slivovice

In the Czech Republic and Slovakia slivovice, or slivovica, respectively (as well as other fruit-based distilled alcoholic drinks) due to the somewhat symbolic status of the Moravian "national" drink is strongly presented in local traditions, culture and pop culture like in proverbs, songs, TV shows and movies.

Slivovice is primarily produced in the southern and eastern provinces of Moravia and in Vysočina, where the country retains its rural character. Although not legal, traditional moonshine home distilleries are very common across the Moravian countryside, nonetheless, the majority of private production moved to certified local community-owned distilleries to prevent errors during the distillation process (leading to concentration of toxic methanol). Certified production also allows state authorities to collect respective taxes (based on the proof of the alcohol in the final product), however tax-reliefs for limited private and non-commercial production of the drink exist. The usual proof of private-produced slivovice is over 50% of alcohol in the final product, commercially available mass-produced slivovice is proofed less.

Slivovice is mostly served in small shot glass known locally as "panák" (literally: a dummy),"baňa" " (variation of the word shot/bang in dialects of southeastern Moravia), "kalíšek" (colloquial for a small cup) or "štamprle" (from German "das Stamperl", a little glass). Keeping slivovice cold helps to reduce the effects of high proof or not ideal taste; however, the drink is not to be served on the rocks. The only accurate way to drink slivovice is a shot glass. To enjoy the aroma and taste of the original fruit it is better and more common to drink slivovice served at room temperature.

=== Poland ===
The mountainous region of southern Poland has a long tradition of making slivovitz. Historically it has been distilled by local Goral highlanders and not necessarily given any particular brand names. One of the more recognised of such products is Śliwowica łącka associated with the town of Łącko. However, due to the fact that it is made without any specific control and brand ownership it has declined in quality, especially in recent years.

Slivovitz was also distilled in large quantities by the Jewish community of Poland before the Second World War. As a popular Passover alcohol, slivovitz had a strong standing among the traditional Jewish-Orthodox communities. State-owned distillers tried to reintroduce the slivovitz based on Jewish traditions in the form of Pejsachówka. After 1989, Pejsachówka had disappeared from the market. Polish distillers continue to produce Śliwowica Paschalna and Śliwowica Strykowska (Strykover Slivovitz), which are both certified as kosher.

=== Serbia ===
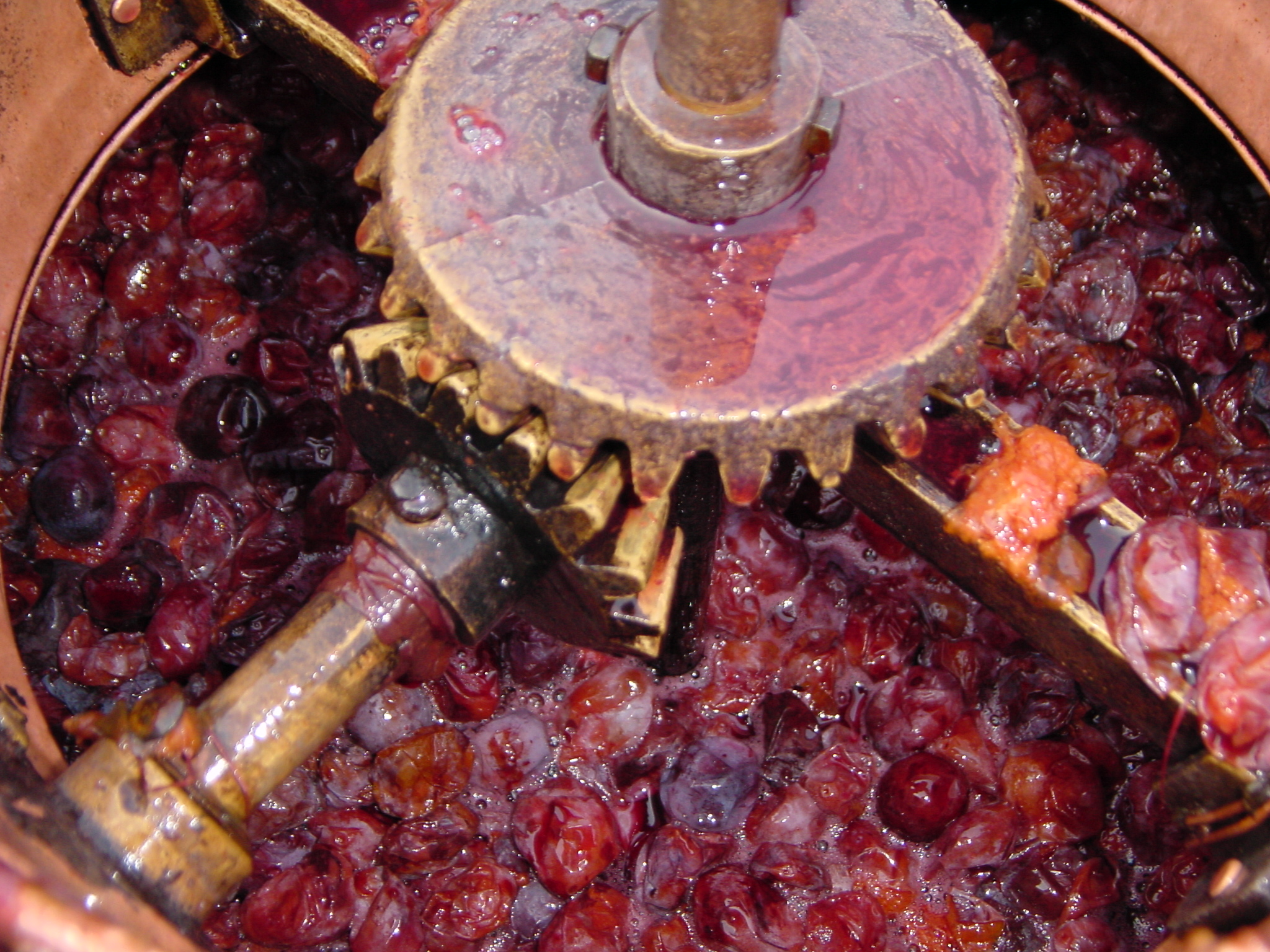
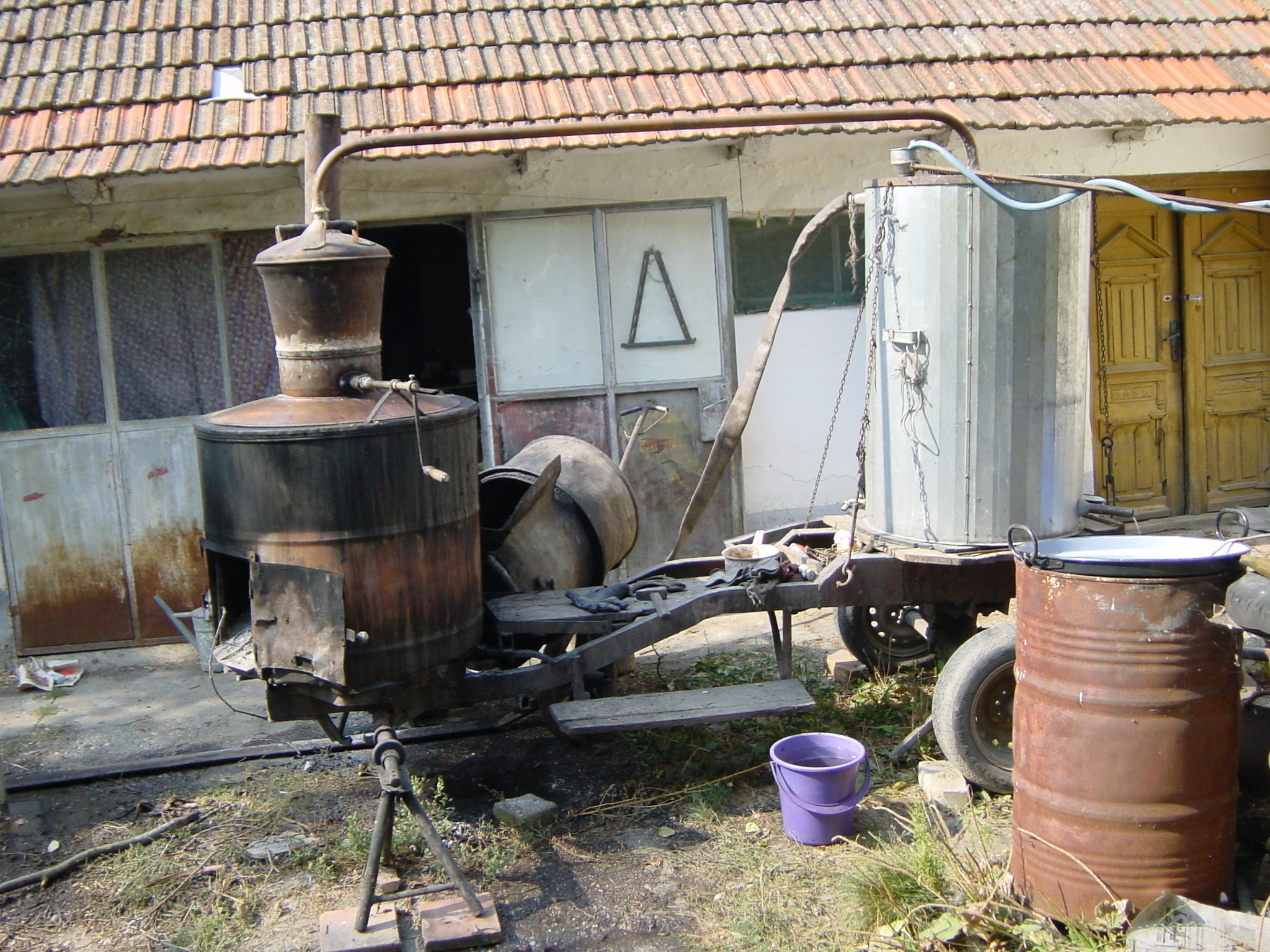
Simple manufacturing system of Slivovitz, in the village Srpski Itebej, Serbia (26 September 2009)

Šljivovica (Serbian Cyrillic: шљивовица, pronounced [ˈʃʎîʋoʋit͜sa]) is the national drink of Serbia in domestic production for centuries, and the plum is the national fruit. Šljivovica has a Protected Designation of Origin (PDO). Plum and its products are of great importance to Serbs and are a part of numerous traditional customs. A Serbian meal sometimes starts or ends with plum products and šljivovica is served as an apéritif. A saying goes that the best place to build a house is where a plum tree grows the best. Traditionally, šljivovica (commonly referred to as "rakija") is connected to a Serbian culture as a drink used at all important rites of passage (birth, baptism, military service, marriage, death, etc.). It is used in the Serbian Orthodox patron saint celebration, Slava. It is used in numerous folk remedies, and is given certain degree of respect above all other alcoholic drinks. The fertile region of Šumadija in central Serbia is particularly known for its plums and šljivovica. In 2004, over 400 000 litres of šljivovica was produced in Serbia. In 2017, Serbia was the 5th largest producer of plums and sloes in the world.

After legal disputes, following the compromise of 2007 "Serbian Slivovitz" (Serbian: Српска шљивовица / Srpska šljivovica) became Serbia's first certified national brand.

Šljivovica is consumed either directly from a leather-wrapped round bottle, or chilled in a shot glass called čokanjčić (plural: čokanjčići). There is also a town in Zlatibor, called Šljivovica. A popular print in Serbia depicts a moustached peasant wearing the šubara (fur hat), drinking šljivovica from a leather-wrapped bottle, with the motto: "Fuck the Coca, fuck the pizza, all we need is šljivovica".

In 2021, Serbia's šljivovica was added to the United Nations Intangible Cultural Heritage List as a "cherished tradition to be preserved by humanity".

=== Bosnia, Croatia and Slovenia ===
In Slovenia, it is known as slivovka.

== See also ==
- Damassine
- Damson gin
- List of Slivovitz producers
- Plum jerkum
- Tsikoudia
- Tsipouro
