= Prunus insititia =

Prunus insititia may refer to:

- The species Prunus domestica, commonly referred as European plum
- Damson, a subspecies of Prunus domestica, also known as Prunus domestica subsp. insititia, or sometimes Prunus insititia
