= Perdrigon =

Culinary plum

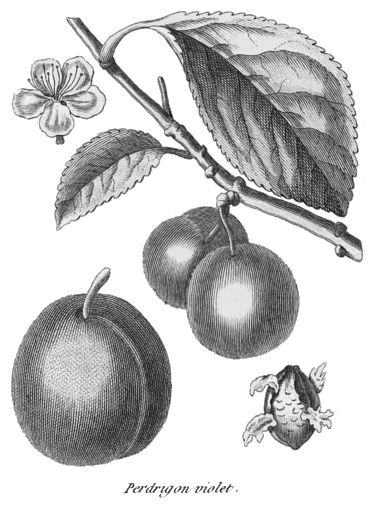

The perdrigon, occasionally spelt "perdigon", is an old variety of culinary plum originating in the south of France. It is sometimes classified as a variety of Prunus domestica subsp. insititia, like the British damson and German krieche, though it has significant differences from both. It was once classed as Prunus pertigona or Prunus domestica pertigona.

The tree flowers in late March, bearing in late August or early September. Hogg noted that the perdrigon's blossom was very tender and susceptible to spring frosts, requiring the tree to be grown against a south-east wall. The fruit is small and oval, with relatively rich, sweet green flesh and a purple, heavily bloomed skin that is often too tough for eating with the fruit. A red, white and yellow perdrigon are recorded along with the more commonly described violet form (perdrigon violet).

The perdrigon is a long-established variety: Richard Bradley mentions it in 1726 as "a fine Plum, either raw, or in Sweetmeat", and distinguishes four types. It was particularly associated with the town of Brignoles in France, where it is still grown for drying. The flat, golden dried fruits are known as pistoles from their resemblance to the pistole, a historic coin. The fruits are also used to make fruit preserves.
