= List of Slivovitz producers =

This is a list of Slivovitz producers.

== By country ==
=== Australia ===
- Tamborine Mountain Distillery

=== Bosnia and Herzegovina ===
- Hepok
- Monogram rakija
- Prijedorčanka
- Slap spirits
- Stršljen rakija

=== Bulgaria ===
- Elenska Slivova (owned by the Lyaskovets winery)
- Lesidrenska Slivova
- Tetevenska Slivova (owned by Rudolf Jelínek)
- Troyanska Slivova (owned by Rudolf Jelínek)

=== Croatia ===
- Badel 1862
- Maraska

=== Czech Republic ===
- Bonfier
- Rudolf Jelínek, the most famous distillery based in the town of Vizovice
- Stock
- Žufánek, small family-run distillery

=== Hungary ===
- Zwack

=== Poland ===
- Polmos
- Śliwowica Łącka
- Śliwowica Paschalna
- Śliwowica Podbeskidzka
- Śliwowica Strykowska
- Strykover Slivovitz

=== Serbia ===
- 1804
- Akademska rakija
- Aleksić Prvi/ Gružanska nit
- BB Klekovača
- Belgrade Urban Distillery
- Bosiljčić rakija
- Braća Rajković/Potpis
- Braća Tomašević/Ognjena
- Čedina rakija
- Čiča Zlajina rakija
- Destilerija Prodanović/Misija
- DPM Natural/Prokovača
- Emperus
- Flores
- Golijska suza
- Hubert 1924
- Gorda
- Jelički dukat
- Krstašica
- Minićeva kuća rakije
- Mladenović rakija
- Momirović rakija
- MVP Destilerija/Ornament
- Navip
- Pod mirnim krovovima/Uteha naša
- Podrum Lukić
- Podrum Marić/Dedina rakija
- Podrum Pevac
- Podrum Želja
- Primag/Paunova
- Prokupac
- Pruna
- Quburich Quality/Bojkovčanka
- Rakija iz rakije
- Respekt
- Skaska
- Srpska trojka
- Stara pesma
- Stara Sokolova
- Stari hrast
- Svetica
- Voćne rakije Plazinić
- Wolf Inter Export / Stefan Nemanja slivovitz
- Yebiga
- Zavet
- Zlatna Biserka
- Zlatna Dolina
- Zlatni Tok
- Žubor sa Kablara

=== Slovakia ===
- Bošácka pálenica (Bošácka slivovica)
- GAS Familia (Goral Slivovica 52%)
- Myjavská slivovica 52°
- Old Herold (Bošácka slivovica)
- S 52
- St. Nicolaus (Zbojnícka slivovica 52%)

=== Slovenia ===
- Budič

=== United States ===
- Black Star Farms
- Clear Creek Distillery
- Ellicott City Distillery
- Peach Street Distillers
- Stoutridge Winery and Distillery
- Stringer's Orchard
