= Grand Duke (plum) =

Variety of plum (Prunus domestica)

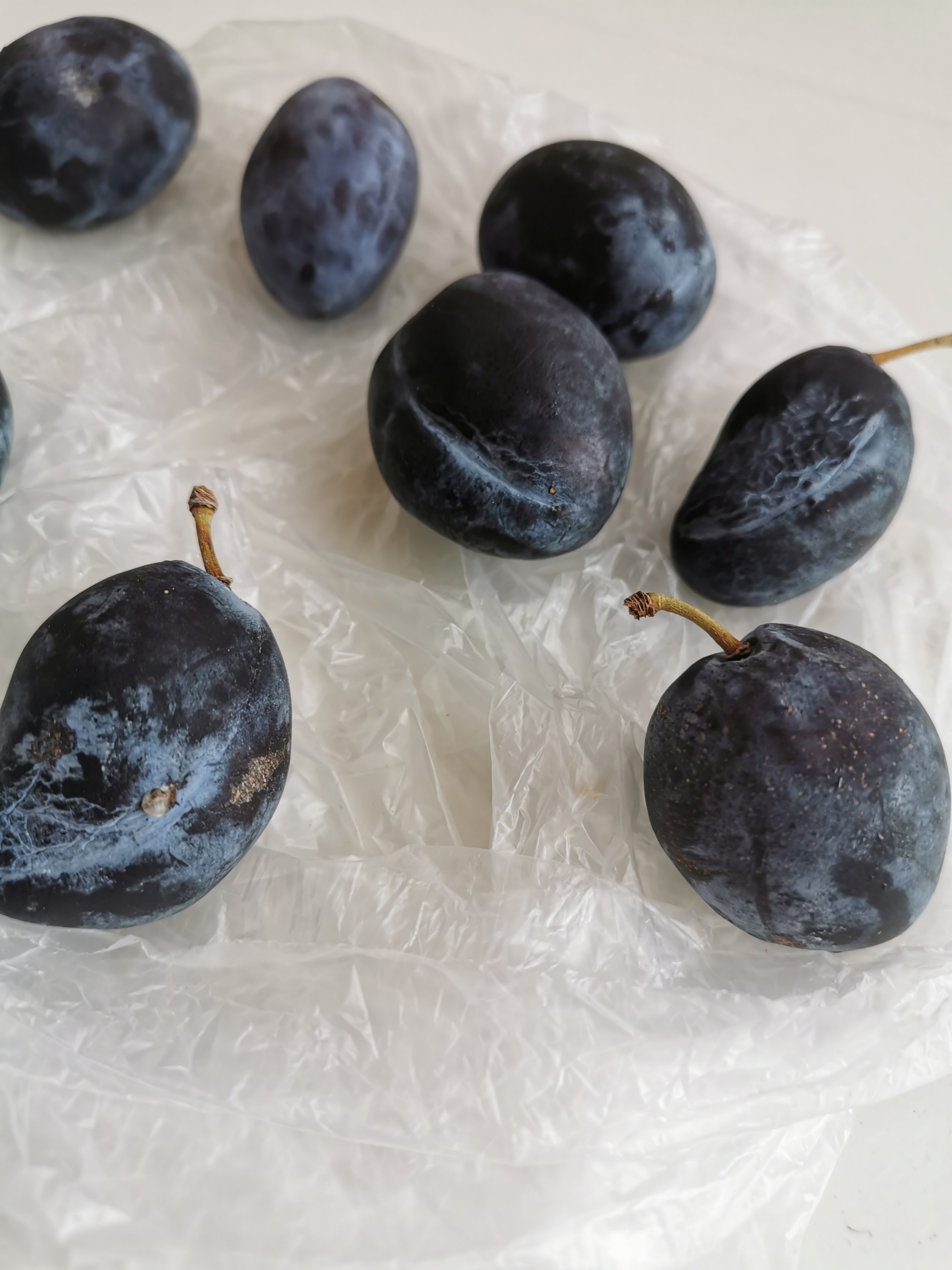
- Species: Prunus domestica
- Cultivar: "Grand Duke"
- Origin: England, produced by 'Thomas Rivers' of Sawbridgeworth, before 1876.

Grand Duke (syn. Grossherzog's Pflaume & Grand-Due) is a variety of plum, one of the so-called European plums. It is one of the many plums produced by Thomas Rivers of Sawbridgeworth, England. The Royal Horticultural Society awarded it a First Class Certificate in 1880. The fruit has a fairly firm, rather dry flesh with a slightly tart to slightly sweet flavor. It can tolerate USDA hardiness zones 5b, 5a, 6b, 6a, 7b, and 7a.
