= Damson gin =

Liqueur

Damsons steeping in gin

Damson gin is a liqueur, usually homemade, made by steeping damson plums in gin with sugar for eight weeks or more, then straining it. Vodka is sometimes used in place of the gin.

Damson gin is especially popular in Britain. Depending on the variety, damsons are picked from August to late September. The liqueur can be used as a Christmas treat.

Averell Damson Gin is produced by the American Gin Co. and is an American take on the beverage. Rather than steeping the damson plums in gin, Averell is made by combining the fresh juice of the fruit with gin and sugar.

== History ==
Damsons were used to make "damson brandy" in the 18th century. Recipes for damson gin appear in British household cookery books by the early 20th century, including S. Beaty-Pownall's Pickles and Preserves, one of the "Queen" Cookery Books (1902) and Mrs C. S. Peel's Still Room Cookery (1905). The 1902 book says that sloe gin "is made in precisely the same way as damson gin". The Café Royal Cocktail Book (1937) describes damson gin as "an English liqueur, dark red colour".

== See also ==
- Sloe gin
- Patxaran
- Nalewka
- Slivovitz
- Țuică
- Pálinka
