= Franciszek Maurer =

Polish architect (1918–2010)

Franciszek Maurer (November 7, 1918 - July 10, 2010) was a Polish architect, artist, and professor at the Wydziału Architektury Politechniki Śląskiej.

== Early life ==
Maurer was born in Łącko near Nowy Sącz in southern part of Poland. At that time this part of Poland belonged to Austro-Hungarian Empire. Four days later Poland gained independence. After graduating from Tadeusz Kościuszko Gymnasium in Lwów in 1938, he started his studies at University of Lwów, Department of Architecture. He continued studies during Soviet and German occupation and received master's degree in 1943. During the occupation he participated in Polish underground resistance movement Armia Krajowa.

== Career ==
In 1946 he started working as an architect, reconstructing country after the war. He managed the Railway Reconstruction Company in Katowice. In 1948 he moved to Gliwice, where he was a chief designer for the reconstruction of the city of Gliwice historical district. At that time he started to work at the University of Gliwice Politechnika Śląska. He was conducting scientific research and teaching the history of architecture, urban design and preservation of historical buildings. He received PhD in 1965 at Gdańsk University.

Franciszek Maurer was a member of the Polish Academy of Sciences in Warsaw and Katowice, section for Architecture and Urban Design and the Commission for the Preservation of the Cultural Monuments. He received numerous medals and decorations for his work (Golden Cross of Merit, Order of Polonia Restituta, Order of Saint Stanislaus)

== Artistry ==
Since his young years, Franciszek Maurer has been passionate about the artistic drawing and painting. He had numerous exhibitions of his work in Poland and abroad in Vienna, Rome, Verona, Turin and overseas in Toronto.

Many public spaces in Gliwice are decorated with mural work by Franciszek Maurer. Commemorative sgrafitto portraits of the famous Polish personalities in Gliwice include gen. Emil Fieldorf "Nil" at St. Barbara church, Wojciech Korfanty at Korfanty Street, gen. Leon Berbecki at the house of his residence on Puszkina Street, poet Cyprian Kamil Norwid at One Norwid Street, General Józef Pilsudski at the square of his name, Saint Jadwiga near the church of Kościół Wszystkich Świętych w Gliwicach.

Franciszek Maurer died on July 10, 2010, in Gliwice. He was active until his last days. His last project, gen. Fieldorf's tablet was unveiled in September 2009. The tablet for father Popiełuszko remains unfinished. He lived 92 years.
