= Damassine =

Fruit spirit made from the red damson plum

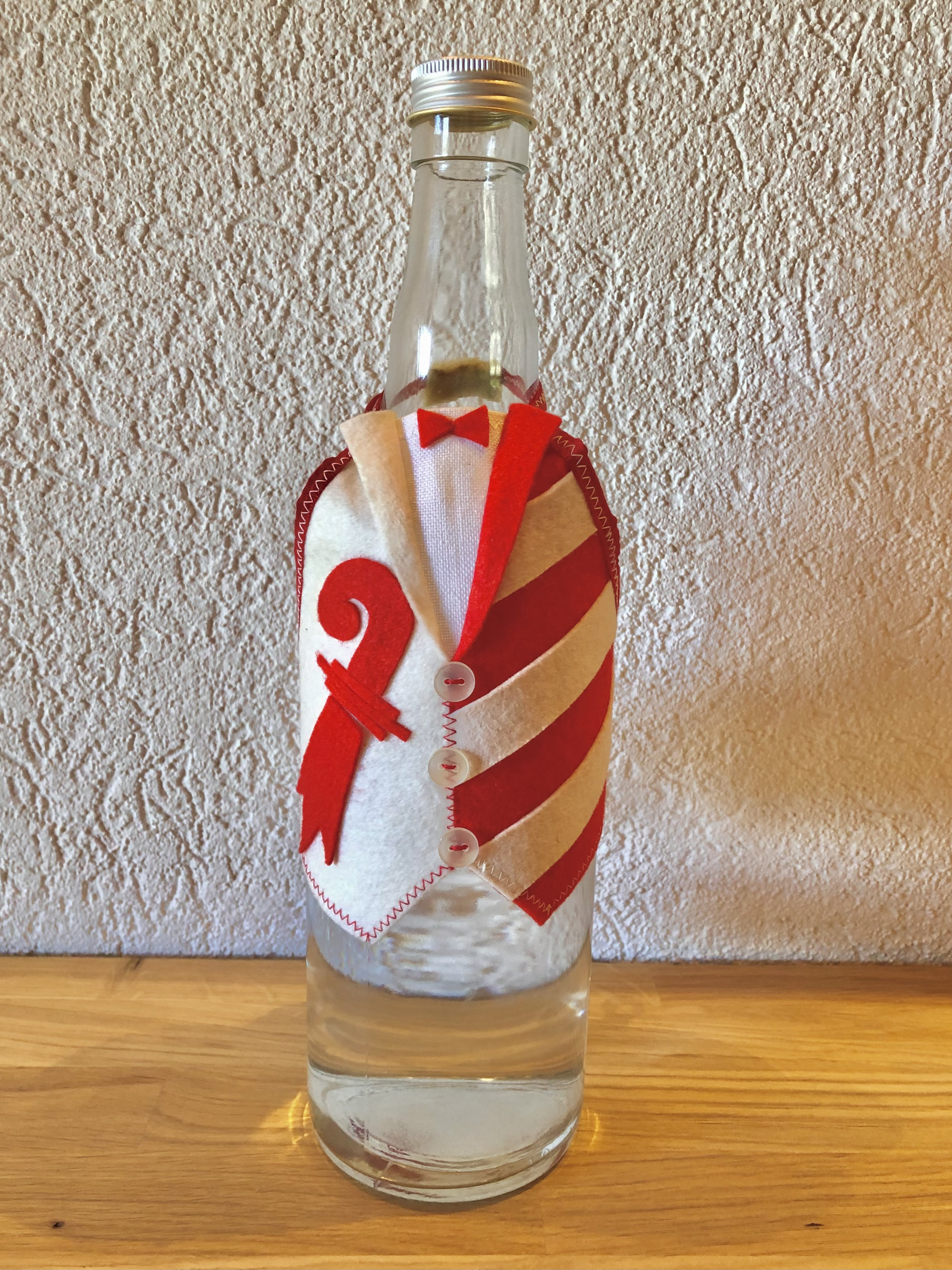
- Type: Fruit spirit, brandy, eau-de-vie
- Origin: Swiss Confederation (Switzerland), Republic and Canton of Jura
- Alcohol by volume: Minimum 40%
- Proof (US): 80° - 96°
- Color: Clear
- Ingredients: Red damson plum (damasson rouge)

Damassine is a clear, fruit spirit, distilled from the red damson plum, produced exclusively in the Swiss Republic and Canton of Jura following appellation d'origine protégée (AOP) guidelines that require specific sourcing and production practices. Damassine is also considered an eau de vie (water of life), more specifically an eau de vie de prunes, and is commonly referred to as a fruit brandy contrary to the regulation defining it as a fruit spirit.

== History ==
The production of damassine in the canton of Jura is an age old tradition however, due to a lack of historical documentation, no one really knows how the red damson plum arrived in the Jura region or how the practice of distilling the fruit began there. The true story, being lost to history, has been replaced by romantic legend and speculation. One legend says that the red damson plum was brought back by the knights that left for the 2nd Crusade in 1129 with Saint-Bernard de Clervaux. Another story has it that a former parish priest named François Guenat, from Charmoille, brought the seeds back with him from a trip to Palestine in 1145. Still another legend attributes the importation of the red damson to the Duke of Anjou who is believed to have discovered it in Jerusalem circa 1220 during the 5th Crusade. Regardless of when the red damson arrived in the canton of Jura and how the practice of distillation began, one thing is certain, the name damassine is derived from Damascus, the capital of Syria.

== Protection of the name Damassine ==
On 7 July 2002, an application for the recognition of the name Damassine was submitted in AOC (Appellation d'origine contrôlée) (Note: Switzerland used the certification AOC for wine and food products until 2013 when they changed to match the system of the European Union which uses the AOC designation only for wine and the AOP designation for other food products including spirits.) by the producers (the Association of Fruit Producers of Ajoie and the Fruits du Jura association) of the Canton of Jura in order to protect the heritage of this product of the Jurassic region. In June 2005, the Federal Office of Agriculture (Switzerland) FOAG accepted the request which was held up in court. Eventually, in August 2007 the FOAG entered the name Damassine into the register of protected indications of origin AOC. (Note: The Swiss used "protected indications of origin" [indication géographique protégée (IGP)] and AOC designations until they were superseded by the European Union system which uses the AOP designation for food products other than wine and the PDO for "protected designation of origin" instead of IGP.) That decision was challenged in the federal courts but, the court decided in favor of the applicants and the protection was finally established on 26 February 2010, granting Damassine the AOP designation. Since then, only plum spirits produced within the boundaries of the Republic and Canton of Jura made in accordance with the AOP guidelines can be labelled Damassine. As part of product certification, Damassine must pass an official tasting (degustation) test before it may be marketed under the protected name. The responsible commission evaluates the taste according to the following criteria:

• Olfactory characteristics and purity;

• Taste and typicality of the fruit;

• Retro-olfaction, taste and purity;

• Balance

== Production ==
In order to be called Damassine, the production of the spirit must adhere to the strict guidelines established for the AOP. To meet these standards, all of the ingredients, even the water for reduction, must originate within the designated Jurassic region. Furthermore, every aspect of production, including storage, must be carried out within the borders of the Canton of Jura.

The process of turning the red damson plums into Damassine starts with the harvest. Under the AOP standards, the harvesting process requires that the plums be collected daily, by hand, only after they have naturally fallen from the trees. Picking the fruit, even shaking the tree, is absolutely prohibited. The fruits must be gathered after they have fallen naturally. For that it is recommended to place collection containers or nets beneath the tree canopy. An exception to the rule regarding daily collection of the fruit exists to allow the gathering of fruit every other day when weather conditions permit and also at the beginning and ending of the harvest season. The red damson harvest begins in mid-July and continues on until the end of September.

Once the fruit is harvested, the barreling process must take place quickly or the delicate fruit will begin to spoil. All the harvested fruit must be barreled by the day after harvesting at the latest. Pitting or grinding of the fruit is also prohibited under AOC guidelines. Fermentation takes place within the barrels or sealed tanks without the addition of heat (or brewing).

When the fermentation process is complete (no later than 31 December of the harvest year), the distillation process begins. During this period, the distiller will generally need to add water to the spirit to reduce its alcohol content. This distilled or demineralised water must be from the protected region. The minimum alcohol percentage of Damassine is 40% and the alcohol content of commercially produced Damassine generally ranges from 40% to 48% alcohol by volume or 80° to 96° proof.

After distillation, Damassine must be stored for no less than six months in sealed containers and can not be sold prior to 11 November, of the year after harvest (St. Martin's Day). The annual production of Damassine as of 2008 was between 10,000 and 12,000 bottles. Swiss agricultural reporting in 2022 described average annual output as about 10,000–12,000 litres of spirit.

The following blends are prohibited:

- Spirits from different harvest years
- Spirits from fruit from grafted and ungrafted trees
- Spirits from fruits belonging to different political municipalities.

== Fruit ==
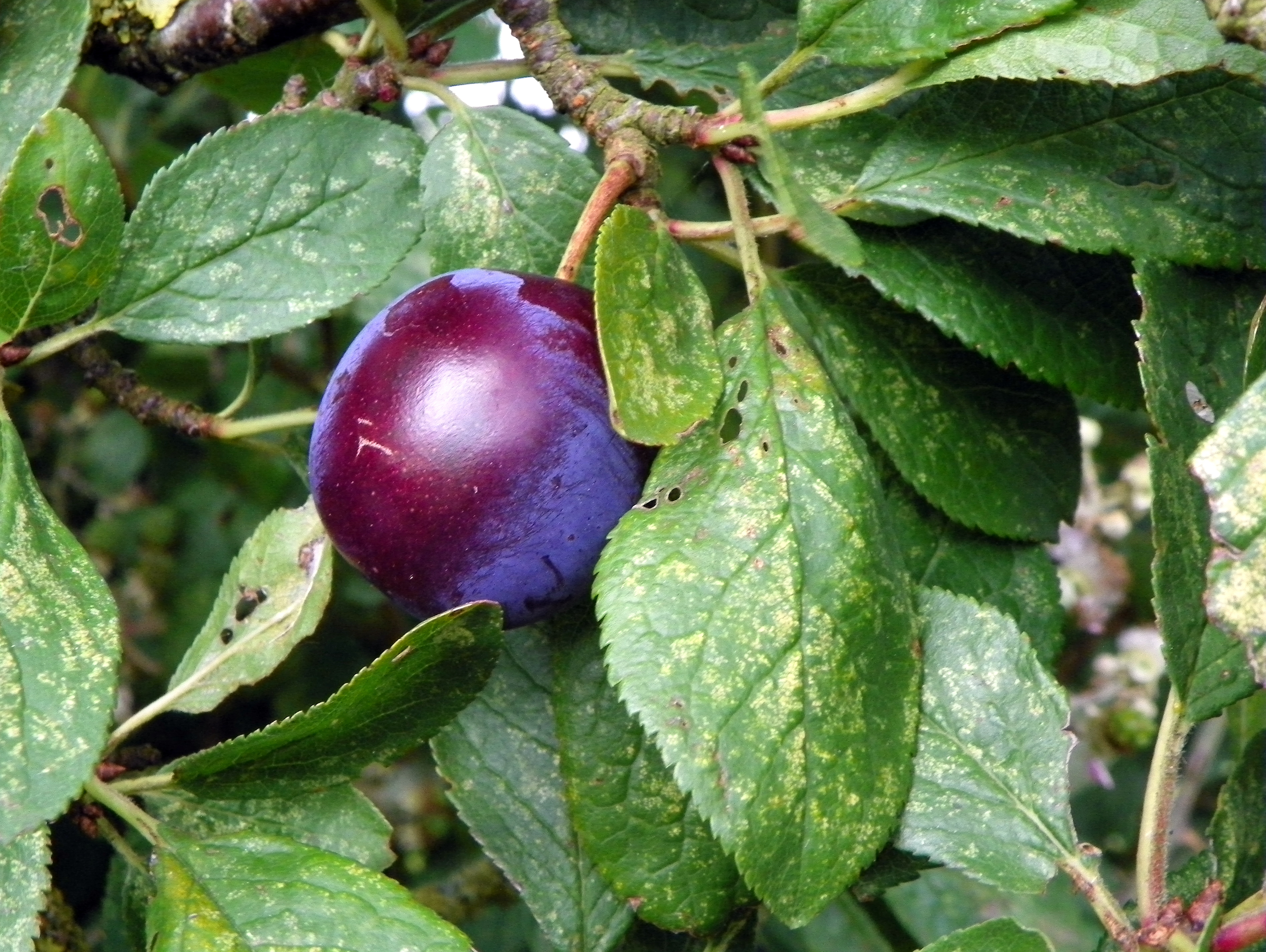
Damson plum

The red damson plum or damasson rouge was also originally called the damassine plum but, after protected status was granted to the name Damassine, the fruit had to be renamed. The red damson is "a small red plum a thousand scents". Off-round to slightly oval in shape, it weighs between 6 and 10 grams and measures approximately 2 centimeters in diameter. The color of its skin is not uniform. Predominantly ranging from pink to red, it can also be dark red on the sun-exposed side, while slightly yellow with reddish dots on the other side. The size and color may vary from season to season, from tree to tree, and even from one branch to another. The red damson has yellowish, slightly orange, juicy flesh that does not adhere to the kernel with a thick skin that adheres lightly to the flesh. The fruit ripens late in the month of July and through to early August. When fully ripe, it falls from the tree naturally. This is the right time to collect the fruit, as picking it or shaking it from the tree would result in a loss of flavor and scent. Approximately 900 red damsons are required to distill one liter of Damassine. Red damsons are used to produce a number of other products including other liquors, syrups, jams, pies, chocolates, truffles, and prunes.

== Tasting ==
In Switzerland, Damassine is traditionally served in a stemmed, fluted glass and is typically consumed as a digestif. Damassine owes its distinctive taste and aroma to the region's limestone soil and climate (terroir). The official specification describes a strong wild-plum character with aromas of bitter almond and cut (dry) grass, with additional fruity/sweet or spicy notes. The aromas are very complex and are composed of a variety of ingredients. The scents of wild plum are dominant, while herbal and bitter almond notes are always present. The wild plum scents are naturally explained by the fruit's morphology (proportion of kernel to flesh) while the herbal scents probably come from the fact that the fruit is gathered only after having fallen on the ground. The secondary aromas are similar to those of other stone fruit (cherries, mirabelle), sweetness (honey, dried banana), and spices (coriander, cloves with a little touch of cinnamon).

== Events ==
In 2022, a public ‘Fête de la Damassine AOP’ was launched in Ajoie; the first edition was held on 24–25 September 2022, with events in Porrentruy and Mormont. The event was intended to attract visitors from Ajoie, the Jura, and the rest of Switzerland to taste the products.The event was intended to attract visitors from Ajoie, the Jura, and the rest of Switzerland to taste the products.

== See also ==
- Protected designation of origin
- Appellation d'origine protégée
