= Plum jerkum =

Alcoholic drink

Plum jerkum is an alcoholic drink produced from plums. It has been variously described as made in the same way as cider and as a fruit wine, although the terminology implies slightly different methods. The origin of the name "jerkum" is unclear, although one maker stated he used it because the barrels were shaken once a day during fermentation.

== History ==
The drink is native to the north Cotswolds and particularly to the county of Worcestershire. English plum cultivation was once centred on Pershore and the Vale of Evesham, where plum jerkum was often made by farmers and market gardeners to make use of surplus fruit; it was known as a traditional product of Worcester along with potted lamperns and curd cheesecakes. It was also recorded from the Herefordshire borders and around Chipping Campden in Gloucestershire. The jerkum produced around Chipping Campden was made, for preference, from a dark bullace-like plum found in the area's villages: however it ranged in colour from "a deep purple to a claret red", and in flavour "from a sticky sweetness to a sparkling tartness" depending on the type of plum used. In the 1930s plum jerkum was also recorded as a "homely drink [of] Yorkshire" usually consumed around New Year, though noting that it had been introduced into the county from Worcestershire "over 150 years ago".

In the hands of a skilled maker it could be described as a "wonderful sherry-type wine", but was also humorously characterised as a home-made drink of "doubtful reputation". A 19th-century reference, again from Worcester, suggests that it was often drunk mixed with cider: "plum jerkum is [...] the fermented juice of plums, and is a very heady liquor. In the country they often mix it with cider, and thus moderate its effect [...] A man who was brought before the Pershore magistrates on a charge of drunkenness confessed he had a drop too much of it. Perhaps he took it neat". Wartime sugar rationing meant that the tradition of making plum jerkum and other fruit wines declined in the 1940s and 50s; in 1950 a Western Daily Press columnist lamented that due to the sugar shortage plum jerkum, as well as drinks known as "Black Tom" and "Purple Tea" (sloe gin), had become extinct in the area around Bristol.

The Worcestershire author and farmer Fred Archer mentions jerkum several times in his stories of rural life, as does John Moore in his books set around a fictionalised Bredon Hill.

Some aficionados in American craft beverages have started to use "jerkum" as a broader term encompassing the alcoholic drink produced from any unadulterated fermented stone fruit (e.g., nectarine, peach, apricot, pluot).
