= Łącko, Lesser Poland Voivodeship =

Łącko
- Village
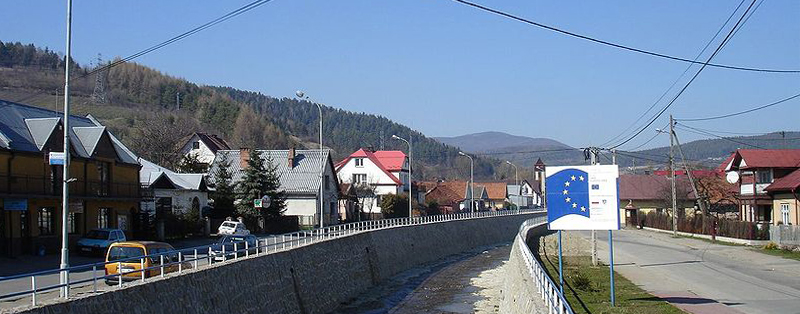
- Czarna Woda stream passing through the town

- Location within Poland
- Coordinates: 49°33′30″N 20°26′06″E
- Country: Poland
- Voivodeship: Lesser Poland
- County: Nowy Sącz
- Gmina: Łącko

Government
  - Soltys: Stefan Grabiec
- Population (2001): 2,700
- Postal code: 33-390
- Area code: +48 18

Łącko [ˈwɔnt͡skɔ] is a village in southern Poland situated in the Lesser Poland Voivodeship since 1999 (it was previously in Nowy Sącz Voivodeship from 1975 to 1998), famous from its apple orchards and traditional home-made slivovitz (Śliwowica Łącka).It is the capital of the White Gorals.

== Notable people ==
- Franciszek Maurer (1918 - 2010), Polish architect and professor

== See also ==
- Dunajec River
- Nowy Targ
- Zakopane
