= Śliwowica łącka =

Plum brandy made in Łącko, Poland

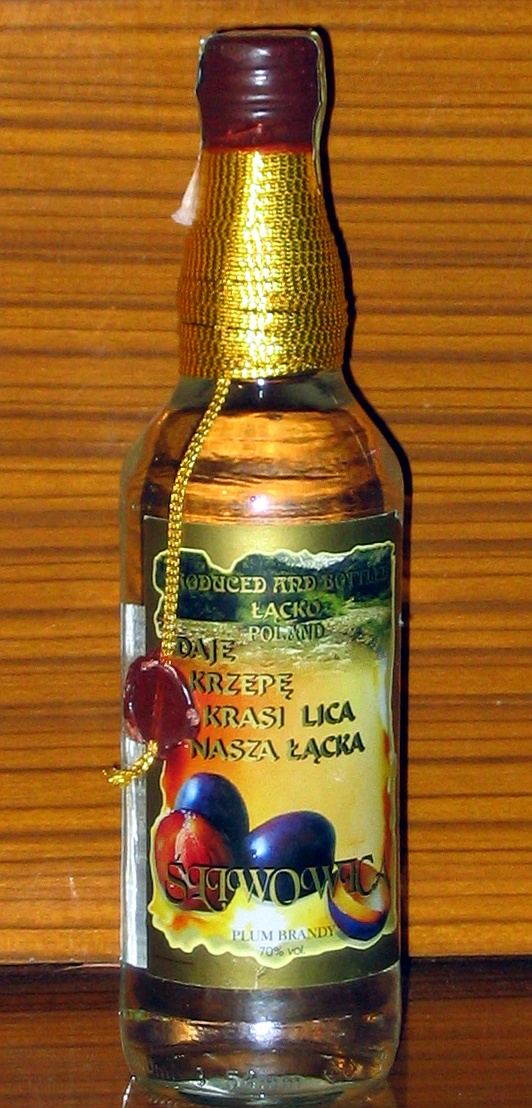

Śliwowica łącka (literally śliwowica from Łącko) is a plum brandy made traditionally in the mountainous regions of Łącko in southern Poland.

Distilled at least since 17th century, the brandy contains usually between 70 and 80 per cent of pure alcohol. As the lands around Łącko are abundant in fruit, "virtually every farmer is known to distill his own brand". Altogether some 300 farmers produce approximately 15 thousand litres of śliwowica a year.

In Poland it is a renowned brand and it also gained much recognition abroad. However, as producing alcohol outside of established industrial distilleries is illegal in Poland, so is the Śliwowica łącka. Numerous social organisations have been campaigning to have this law changed, so far unsuccessfully. A "Fruit-harvesting Festival" celebrating the Śliwowica is held yearly in Łącko.

== See also ==
- Polish cuisine
- Rakija
