= Bullace =

- Black bullaces growing in a Denbighshire hedgerow

Scientific classification
- Kingdom: Plantae
- Clade: Embryophytes
- Clade: Tracheophytes
- Clade: Spermatophytes
- Clade: Angiosperms
- Clade: Eudicots
- Clade: Rosids
- Order: Rosales
- Family: Rosaceae
- Genus: Prunus
- Species: P. domestica
- Subspecies: P. d. subsp. insititia
- Variety: P. d. var. nigra

Trinomial name
- Prunus domestica var. nigra (L.) C.K.Schneid.

Variety of plum

The bullace is a variety of plum. It bears edible fruit similar to those of the damson, and like the damson is considered to be a strain of Prunus domestica subsp. insititia. Although the term has regionally been applied to several different kinds of "wild plum" found in the United Kingdom, it is usually taken to refer to varieties with a spherical shape, as opposed to the oval damsons.

Unlike nearly all damsons, bullaces may be either "white" (i.e. yellow or green) or "black" (i.e. blue or purple) in colour, and ripen up to six weeks later in the year. Though smaller than most damsons, bullaces are much larger than the closely related sloe. Their flavour is usually rather acidic until fully ripe.

== Etymology and origin ==
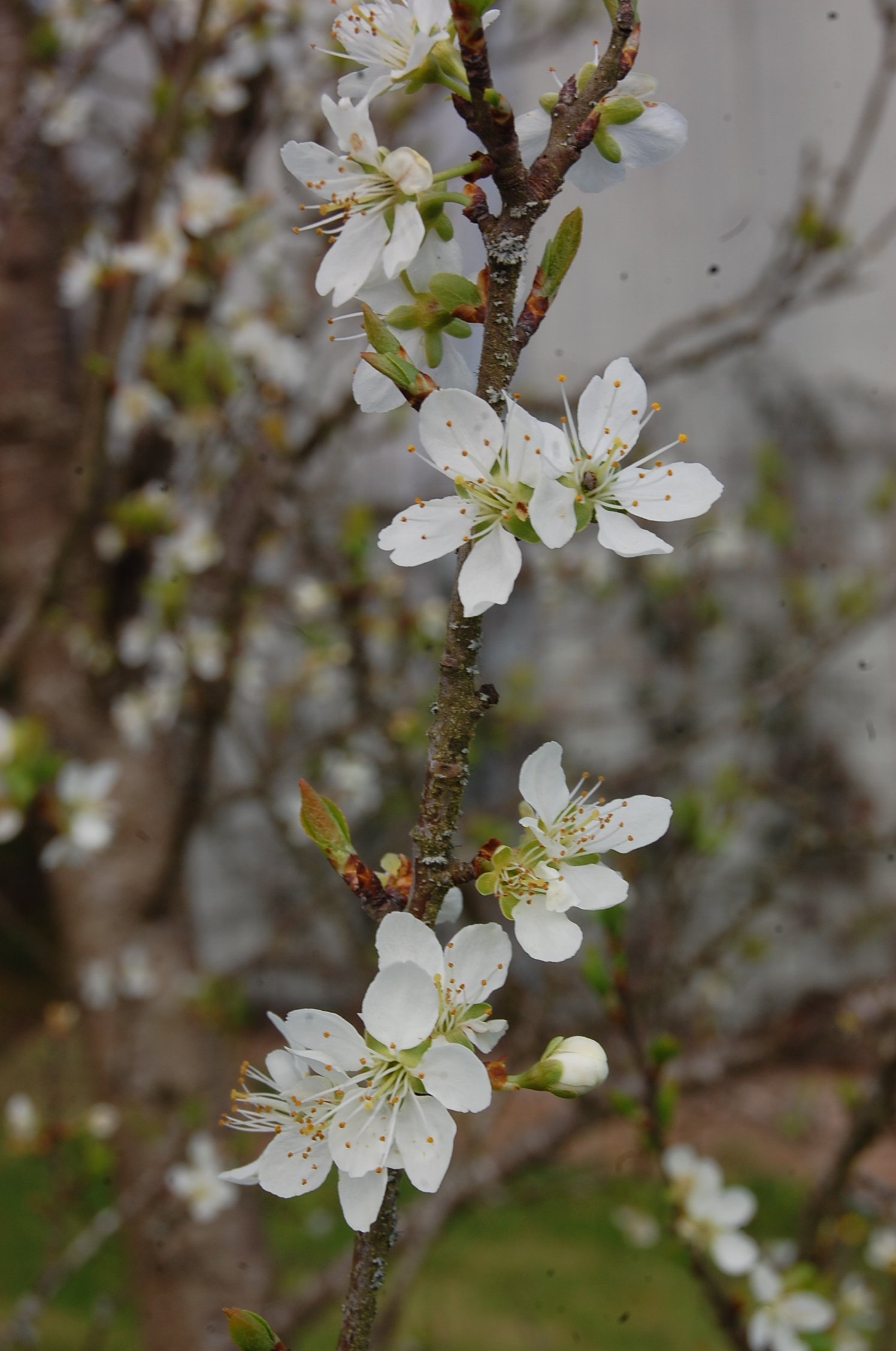
Bullace blossom

The name probably originates from the Old French beloce, meaning "sloe", via Middle English bolas. Wild plums were formerly given the related name "bullies" in parts of Lincolnshire. They were also known as the "bullum-tree" in Cornwall; "bullison" in Wiltshire; "scad" in Sussex; and as the "wild damson" in Yorkshire. The similar word bwlas was used in the Welsh language.

Like other varieties of Prunus domestica, the bullace may have had its origin in hybrids between the sloe (Prunus spinosa) and cherry plum (Prunus cerasifera), though there is also evidence that domestica was solely descended from the latter. Another theory suggests that the bullace developed (or was selected) over time from the sloe, without the involvement of Prunus cerasifera. Prunus insititia is still, however, occasionally regarded as a separate (entirely native) species. It is possible that the bullace is genuinely native to Great Britain: the horticulturalist Harold Taylor, in his book The Plums of England, described it as "the only truly English plum", observing that all other hybrid varieties of plum and damson had at least some non-native origins.

Although once cultivated, and familiar to gardeners of the Tudor period, the bullace gradually fell out of favour as newer, larger or sweeter types of damson or plum displaced it, and it hung on at the fringes of cultivation. Its hardiness meant that, like the damson, it was occasionally planted as a windbreak or hedging tree, and until the 20th century was regarded as valuable for providing fruit very late in the year.

== Varieties ==
Four main varieties of bullace are recognised in England: the White, Black, Shepherd's and Langley. The bullace may be found as a small tree, growing to around 8 metres in height, or as a bush, distinguishable from the sloe by its broader leaves and small number or complete absence of spines. There is, however, a wide variation between trees in different districts due to hybridization and local selection. Bullaces generally ripen in October–November, rather later than other types of plum, and fruit heavily. They may sometimes be found growing wild in woods or hedgerows, particularly near old farmhouses; others may be found in old gardens or orchards, or can still be purchased from some nurseries.

=== Black Bullace ===
The Black Bullace is the common "wild" bullace of woods in England, recognisable by its small, round black or dark purple fruit. It is sometimes classified as insititia var. nigra. It can be quite astringent until very ripe, or subject to a slight frost; a larger variety known as the "New Black Bullace" was later developed from it.

=== White Bullace ===
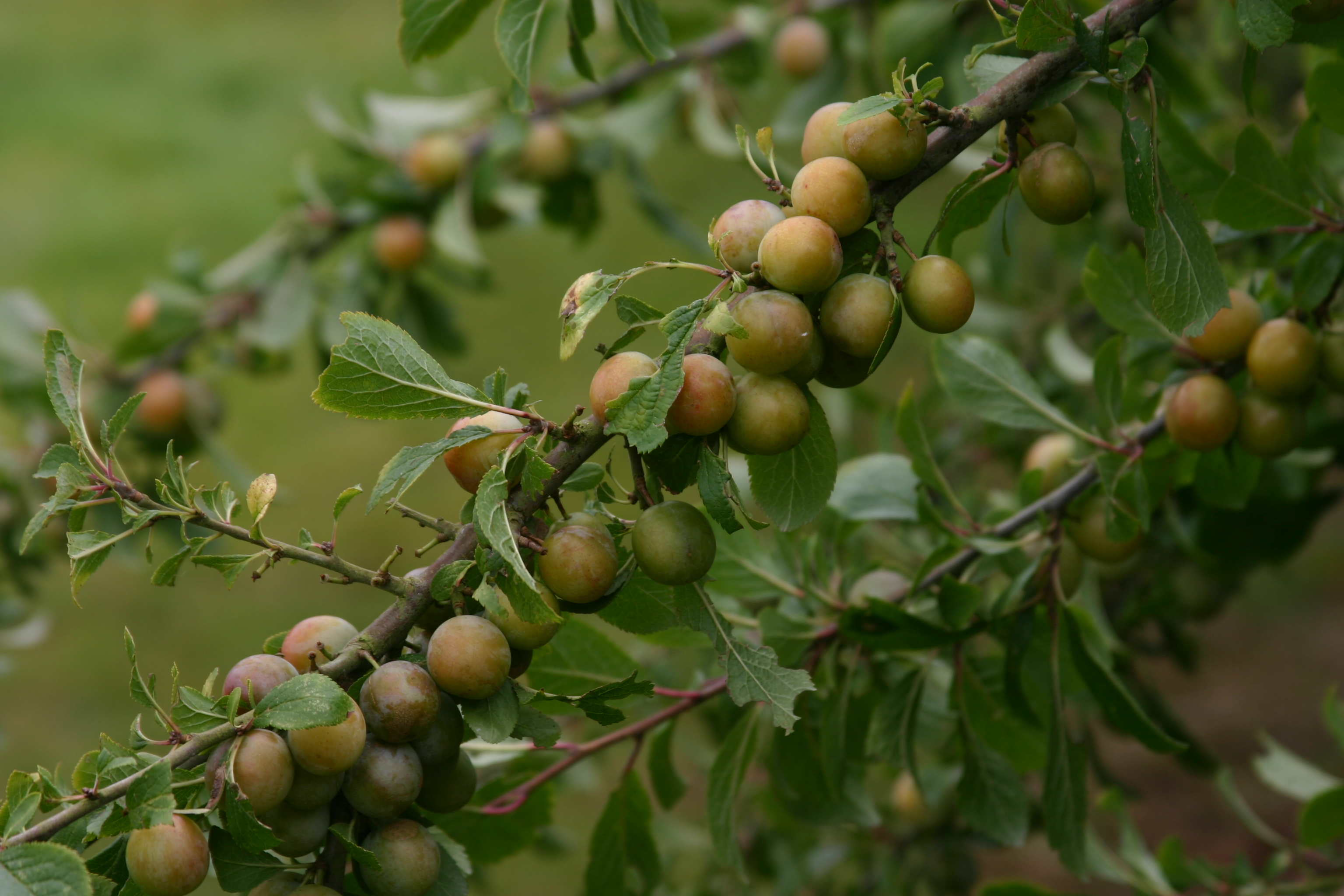
Fruit of the White or Golden Bullace, showing the slight blush often found on the sunward side

The White Bullace, sometimes classified as insititia var. syriaca, has small, yellowish fruit, with greenish flesh. A very old variety, it was once known in Cambridgeshire and Essex by the name "cricksies" or "crickses", formed on an earlier plural "creeks", and probably originating in Anglo-Norman creke. It was grown in large quantities in Norfolk in the 19th century, for use in preserving or cooking; Hogg described the flesh as "firm, juicy, sweet and subacid". It is also occasionally referred to as the "Golden Bullace".

=== Shepherd's Bullace ===
This variety has relatively large round fruit, ripening by October to a grass green or yellowish green colour, with small red spots on the sunward side. It was formerly common in Kent and Essex and may still be found in hedgerows in eastern England.

=== Langley Bullace ===
The Langley Bullace, or "Veitch's Black Bullace", is by far the newest variety, being first raised in 1902 by the Veitch nurseries at Langley, Berkshire. It was a cross between an Orleans plum and the Farleigh damson, and is therefore not considered a true bullace in some sources. This is the largest variety, and when ripe - which occurs in November - is much the sweetest.

=== Other varieties ===
Other names have appeared, but are likely to represent either the above broad types or variations of them; Abercrombie and Mawe, writing in 1779, described three types of bullace, the "white", "black" and "red". Loudon also mentions a black, white and red bullace, as well a double flowered variety flore pleno. Hogg described an "Essex Bullace", which appears in all respects identical to the Shepherd's Bullace, and a "Royal Bullace", said to bear very large, yellow-green fruit. A "New Large Bullace", probably synonymous with the Royal Bullace, was occasionally mentioned, described as very similar to the Shepherd's Bullace but with larger leaves, many of which were glandless, a much more vigorous habit, and lighter cropping.

== Uses ==
Bullaces are often stated to only be suitable for cooking. As well as being used for stewing and making various fruit preserves, they were also traditionally used to make fruit wine, and a bullace pie was stated to be one of the usual centrepieces of a 19th-century harvest home supper in the south of England. However, some bullaces are palatable raw when sufficiently ripe.

== See also ==
- Damson
- Sloe
- Mirabelle
