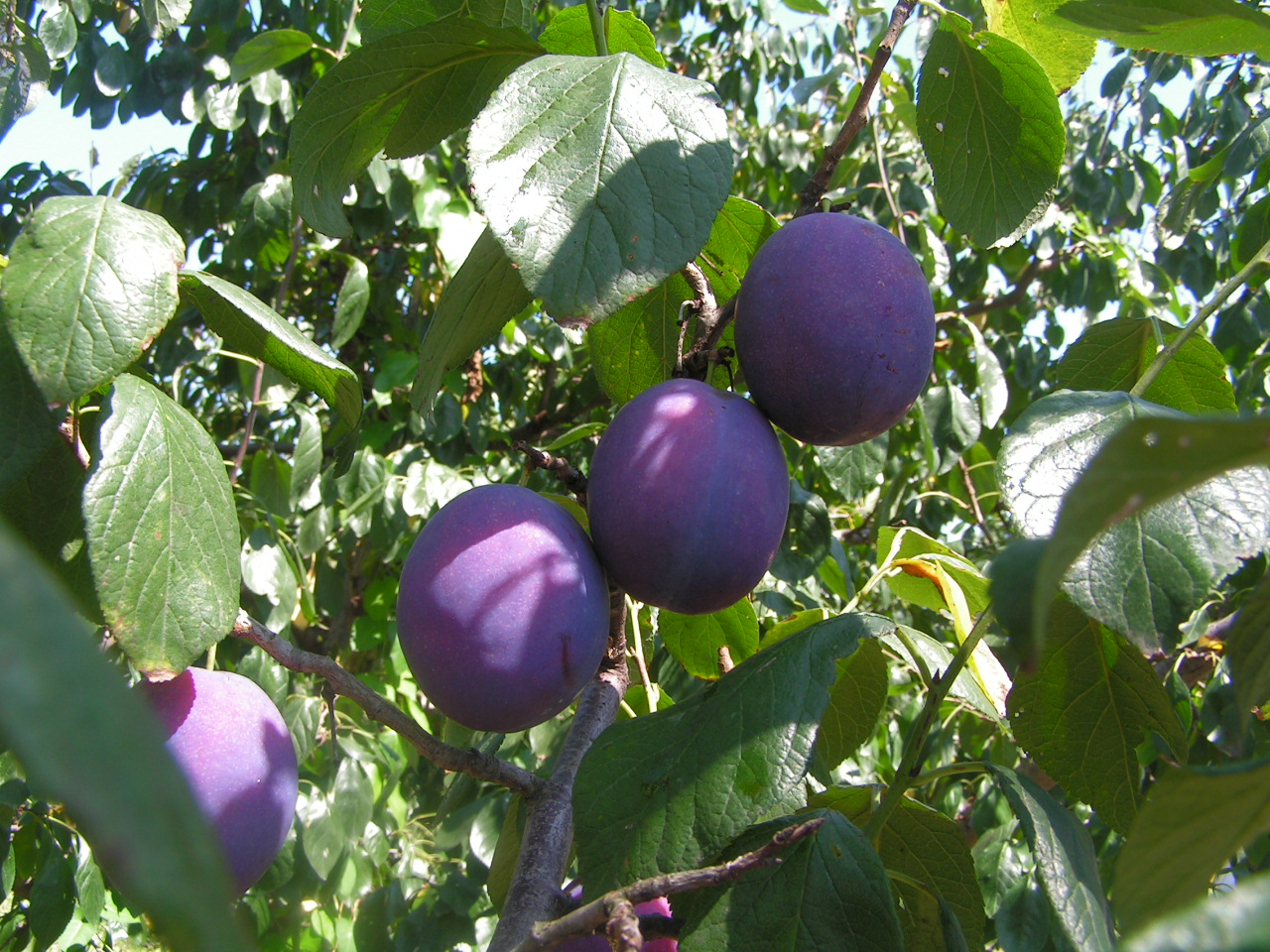

Conservation status
- Data Deficient (IUCN 3.1)

Scientific classification
- Kingdom: Plantae
- Clade: Tracheophytes
- Clade: Angiosperms
- Clade: Eudicots
- Clade: Rosids
- Order: Rosales
- Family: Rosaceae
- Genus: Prunus
- Subgenus: Prunus subg. Prunus
- Section: Prunus sect. Prunus
- Species: P. domestica

Binomial name
- Prunus domestica L.

Synonyms
- List: Druparia insititia Clairv.; Druparia prunus Clairv.; Prunus ambigua Salisb.; Prunus communis Huds.; Prunus dumetorum Callay; Prunus exigua Bechst.; Prunus insititia L.; Prunus italica Borkh.; Prunus lutea Bechst.; Prunus oeconomica Borkh.; Prunus sativa Rouy & Camus; Prunus subrotunda Bechst.; Prunus vinaria Bechst.

= Prunus domestica =

Species of flowering plant

Prunus domestica is a species of flowering plant in the family Rosaceae. A deciduous tree, it includes many varieties of the fruit trees known as plums in English, though not all plums belong to this species. The greengages and damsons also belong to subspecies of P. domestica.

== Description ==
It typically forms a large shrub or a small tree. It may be somewhat thorny, with white blossom, borne in early spring. The oval or spherical fruit varies in size, but can be up to 8 centimetres (3 inches) across. The pulp is usually sweet, but some varieties are sour. Like all Prunus fruits, it contains a single large seed, usually called a stone, which is discarded when eating.

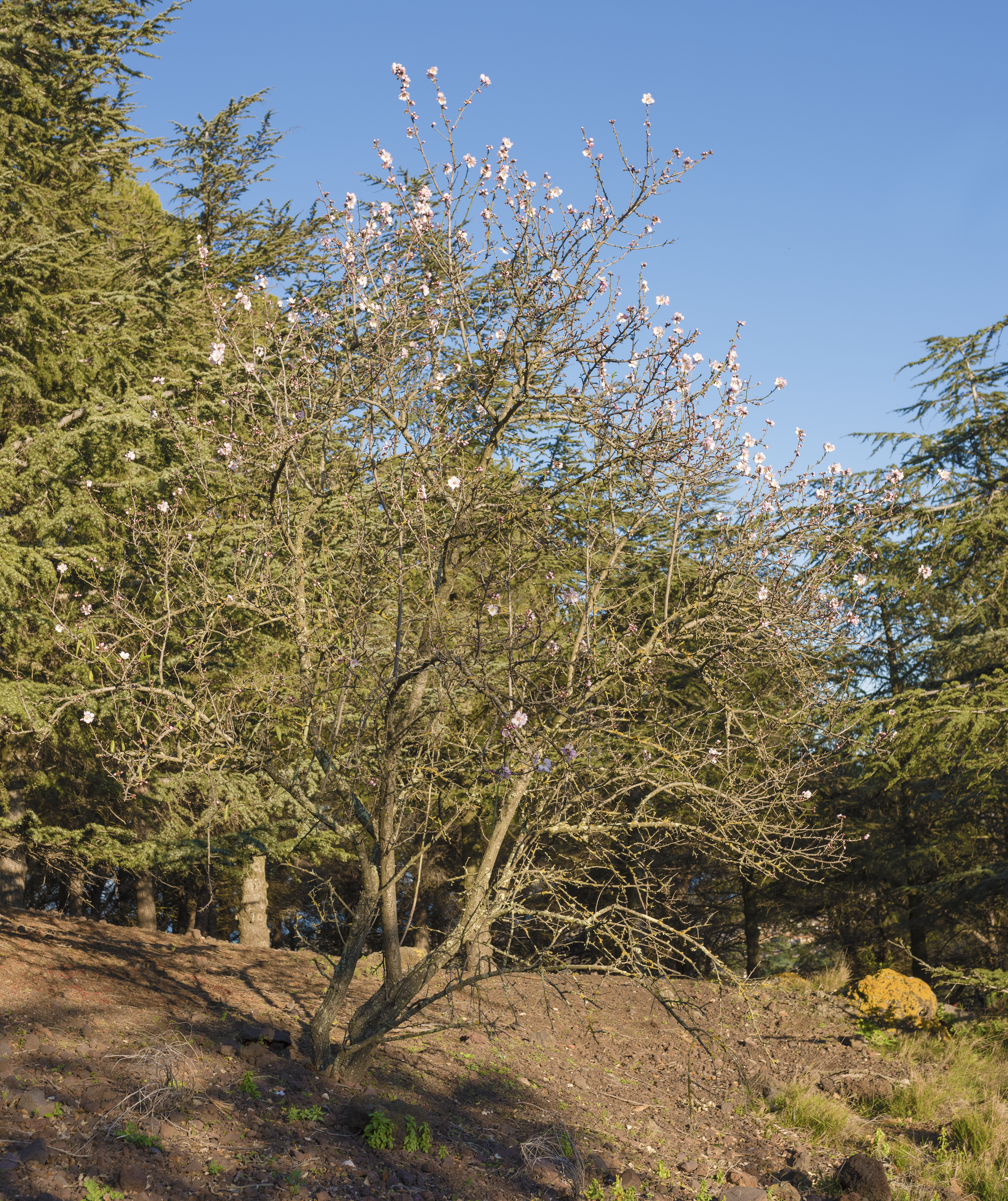
In early bloom

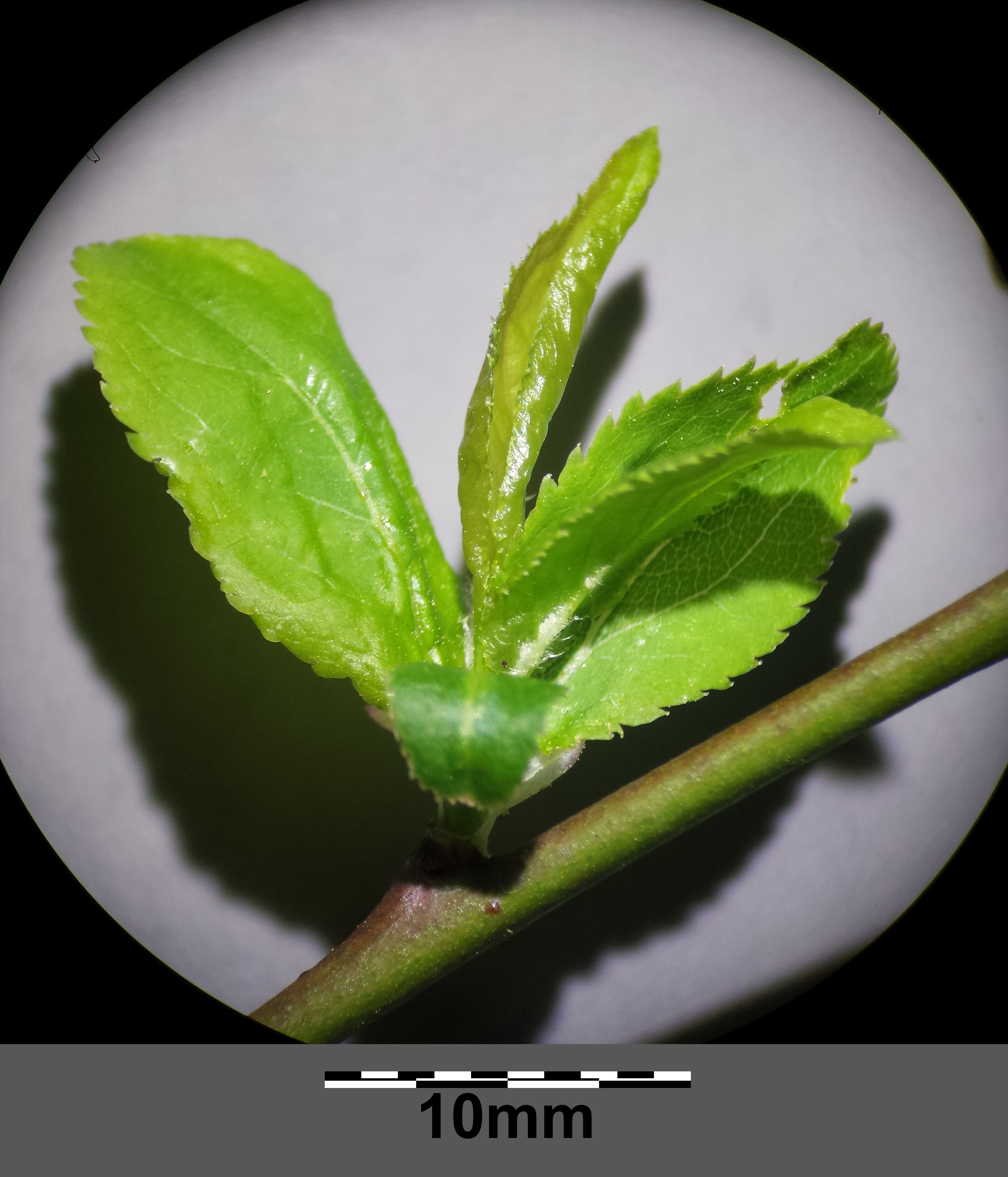
Young leaves

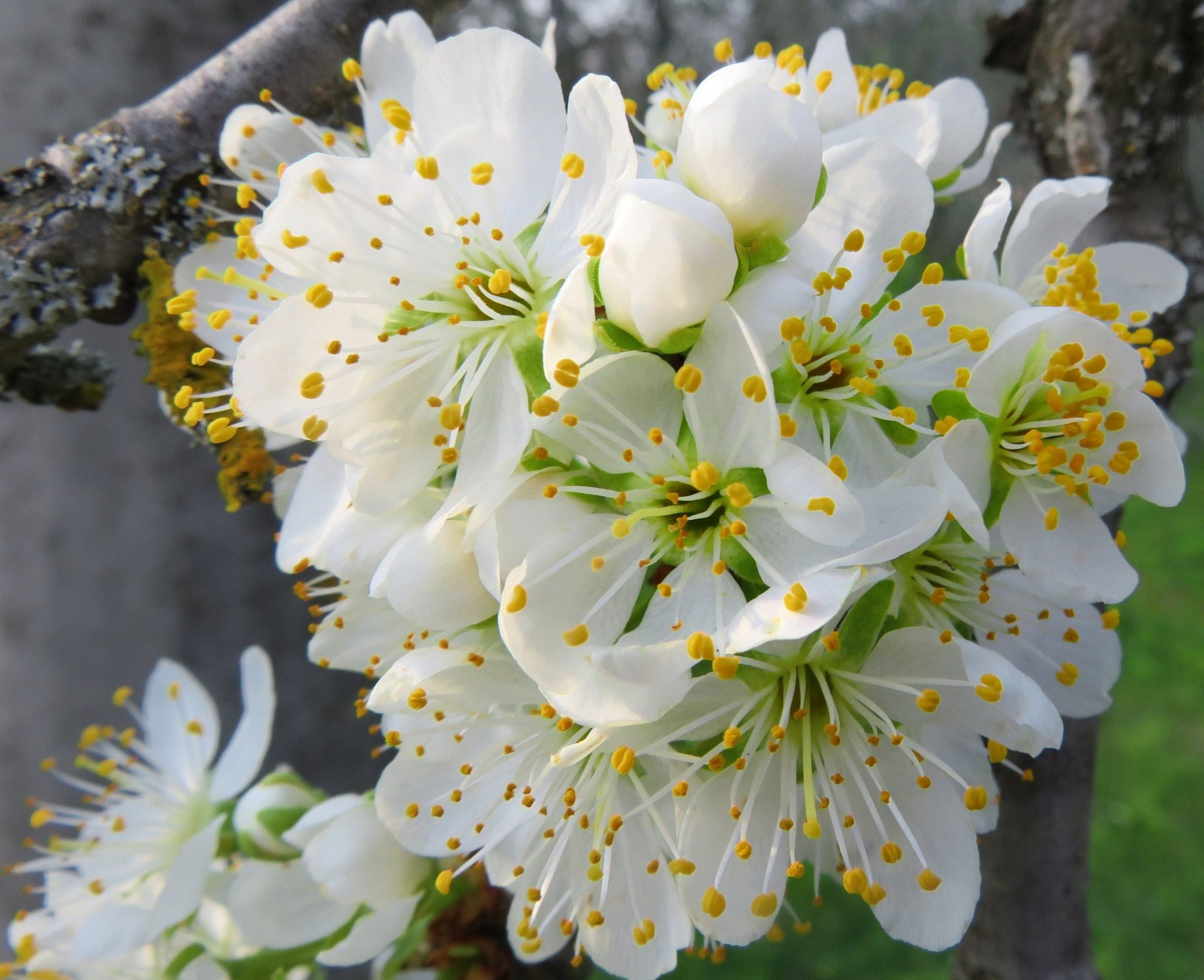
Flowers in spring

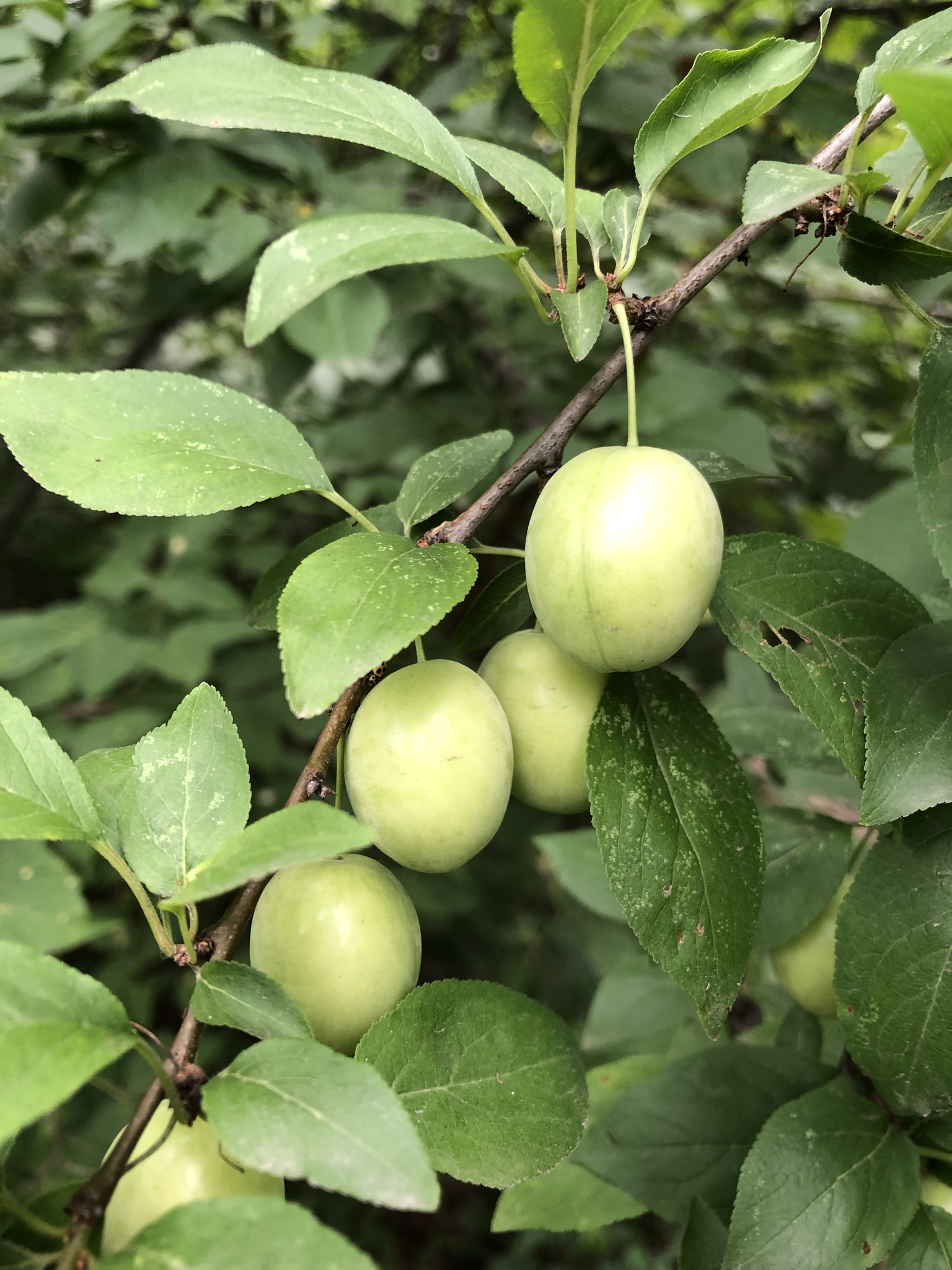
Unripe fruits

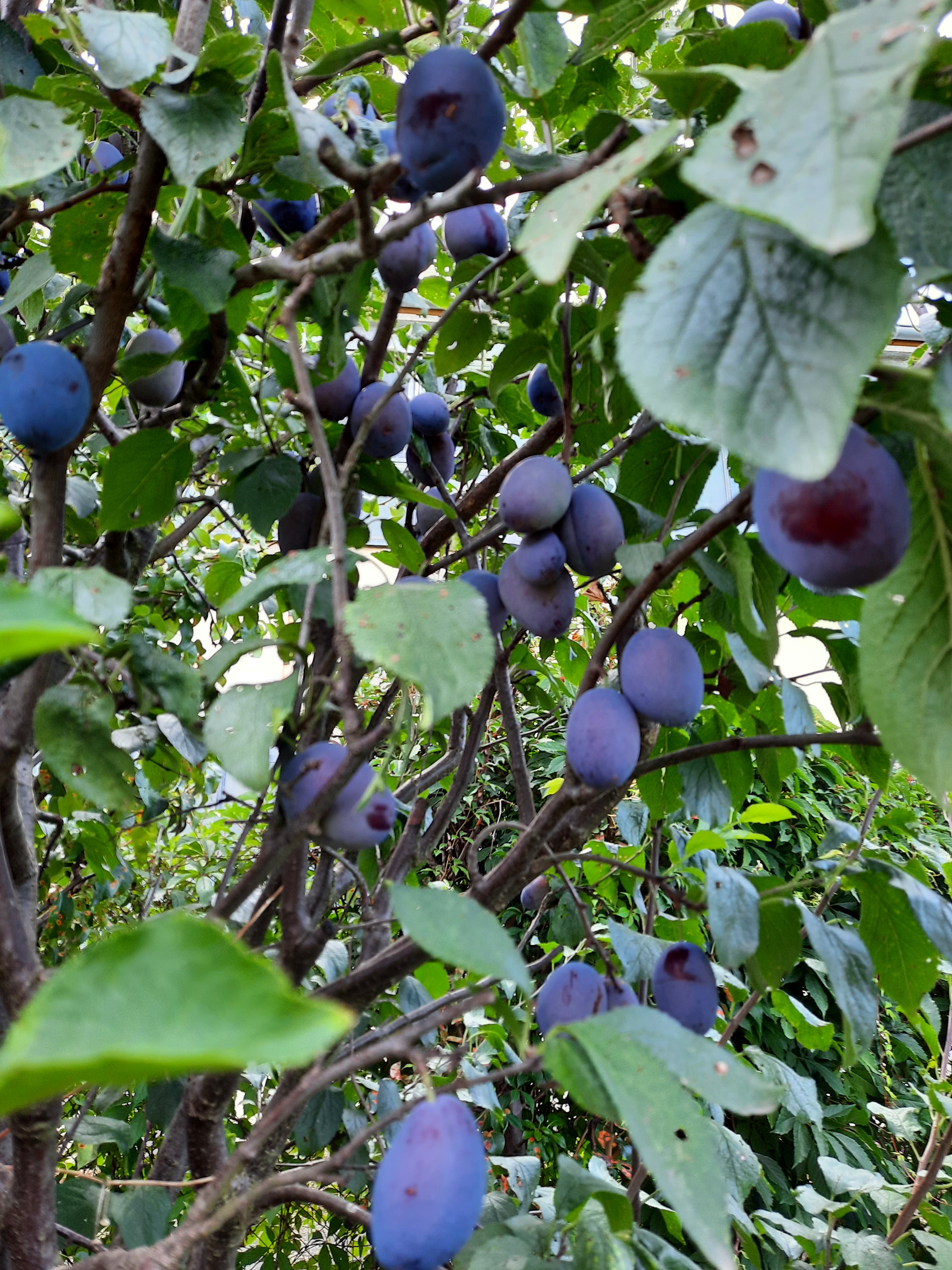
Ripe fruits

== Taxonomy ==
The species' hybrid parentage was believed to be Prunus spinosa and P. cerasifera; however, recent cytogenetic evidence seem to implicate 2×, 4×, 6× (Note: Diploid, tetraploid, hexaploid: see Polyploidy) P. cerasifera as the sole wild stock from which the cultivated 6× P. domestica could have evolved.

=== Subspecies ===
Cullen et al. (1995) recognises three subspecies, though scientific studies favor a more fine-grained separation:

- P. domestica ssp. domestica – prune plums, zwetschge (including ssp. oeconomica)
- P. domestica ssp. insititia – damsons and bullaces, krieche, kroosjes, perdrigon and other European varieties
- P. domestica ssp. intermedia – egg plums (including Victoria plum)
- P. domestica ssp. italica – gages (greengages, round plums etc.; including sspp. claudiana and rotunda)
- P. domestica ssp. pomariorum – spilling
- P. domestica ssp. prisca – zibarte
- P. domestica ssp. syriaca – mirabelle plums

The subspecies cross easily, so that numerous intermediate forms can be found: their sweetness and tartness may vary, their colors varying from bluish-purple to red, orange, yellow or light green.

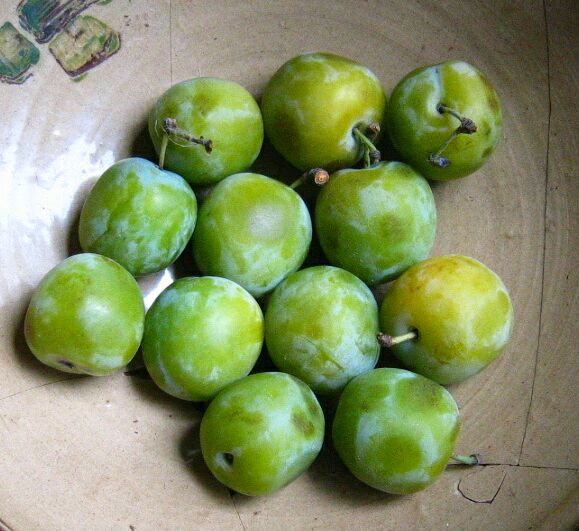
Greengages

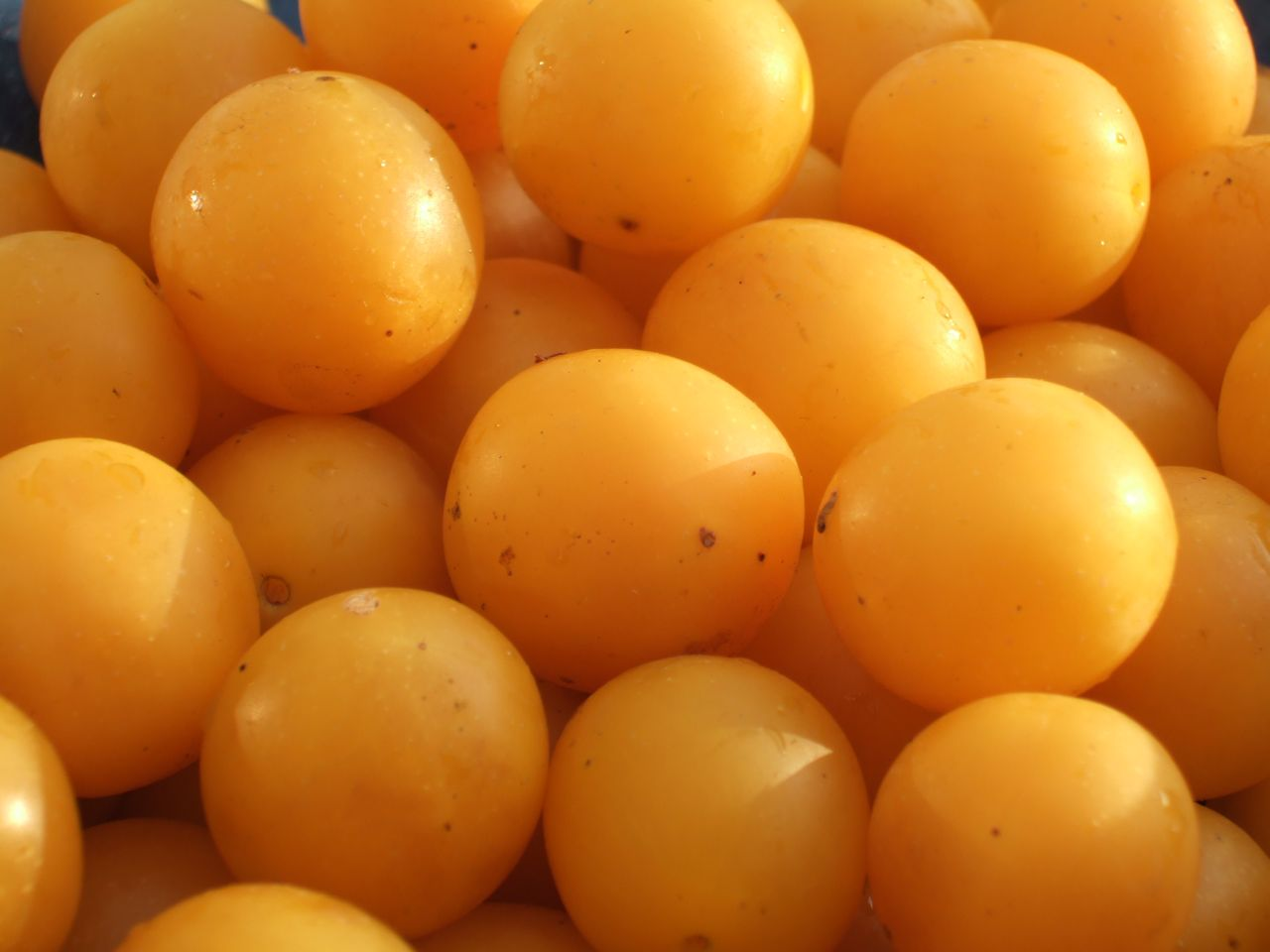
Mirabelle plum

=== Cultivars ===
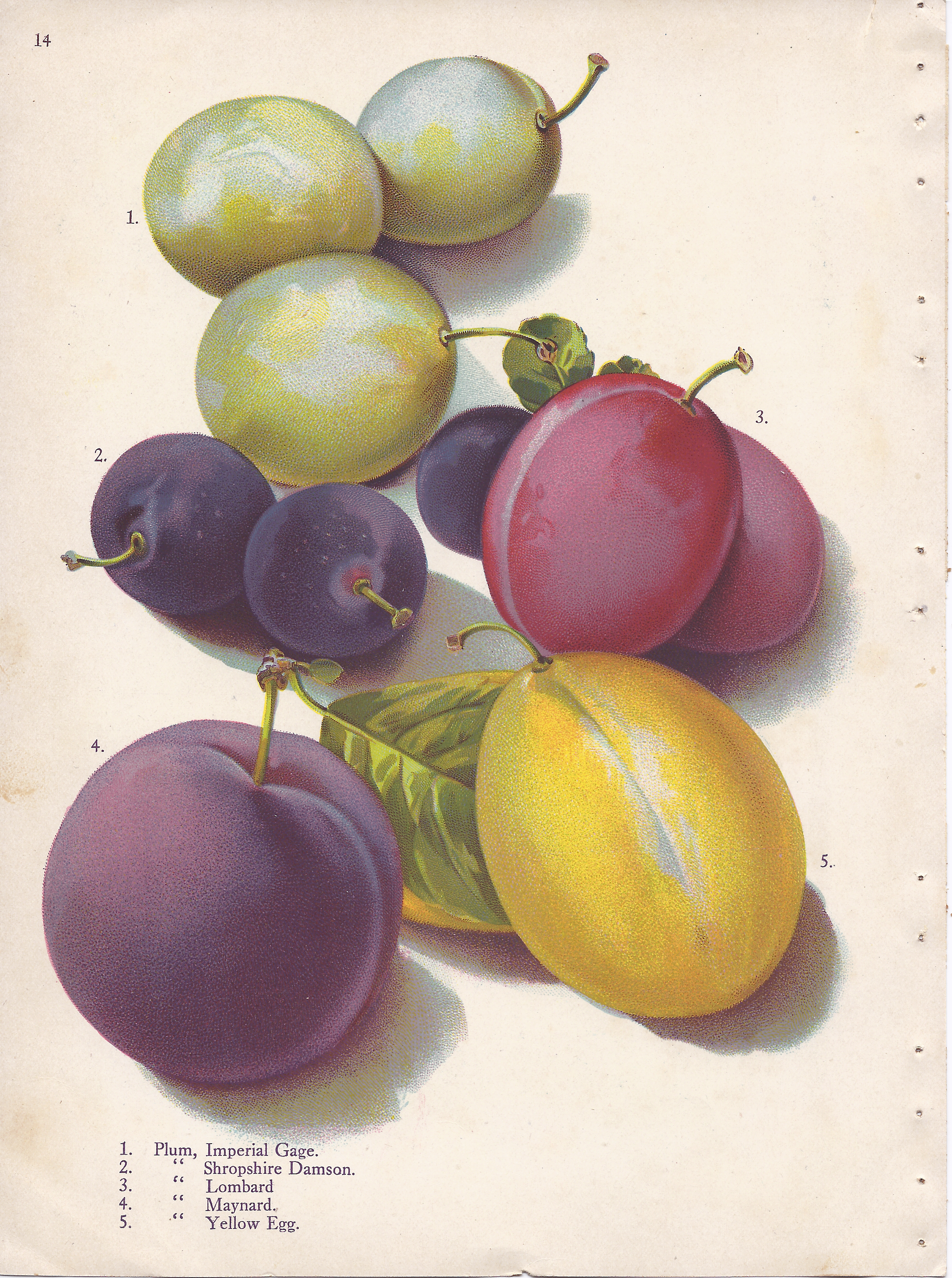
Cultivars: (1) Imperial Gage, (2) Damson, (3) Lombard, (4) Maynard and (5) Yellow Egg

Numerous cultivars have been selected for garden use. The following have gained the Royal Horticultural Society's Award of Garden Merit:

- 'Blue Rock'
- 'Blue Tit'
- 'Czar'
- 'Imperial Gage'
- 'Jefferson'
- 'Laxton's Delight'
- 'Mallard'
- 'Marjory's Seedling'
- 'Opal'
- 'Oullins Gage'
- 'Pershore'
- 'Victoria'

== Uses ==
The pulp is edible and usually sweet, though some varieties are sour and require cooking with sugar to make them palatable.

Plums are grown commercially in orchards, but modern rootstocks, together with self-fertile strains, training and pruning methods, allow single plums to be grown in relatively small spaces. Their early flowering and fruiting means that they require a sheltered spot away from frosts and cold winds.

Most prunes (dried plums) are made from fruits of this species.

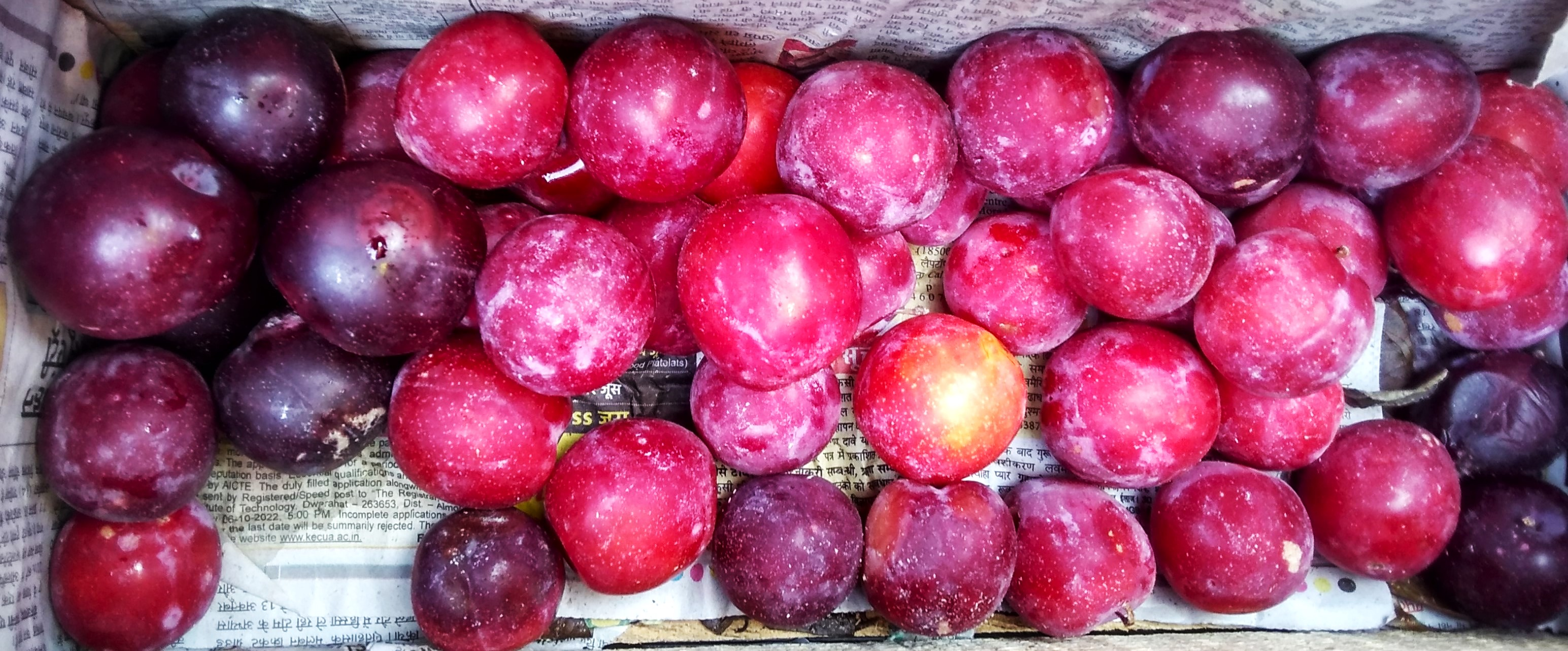
Harvested ripe fruits
