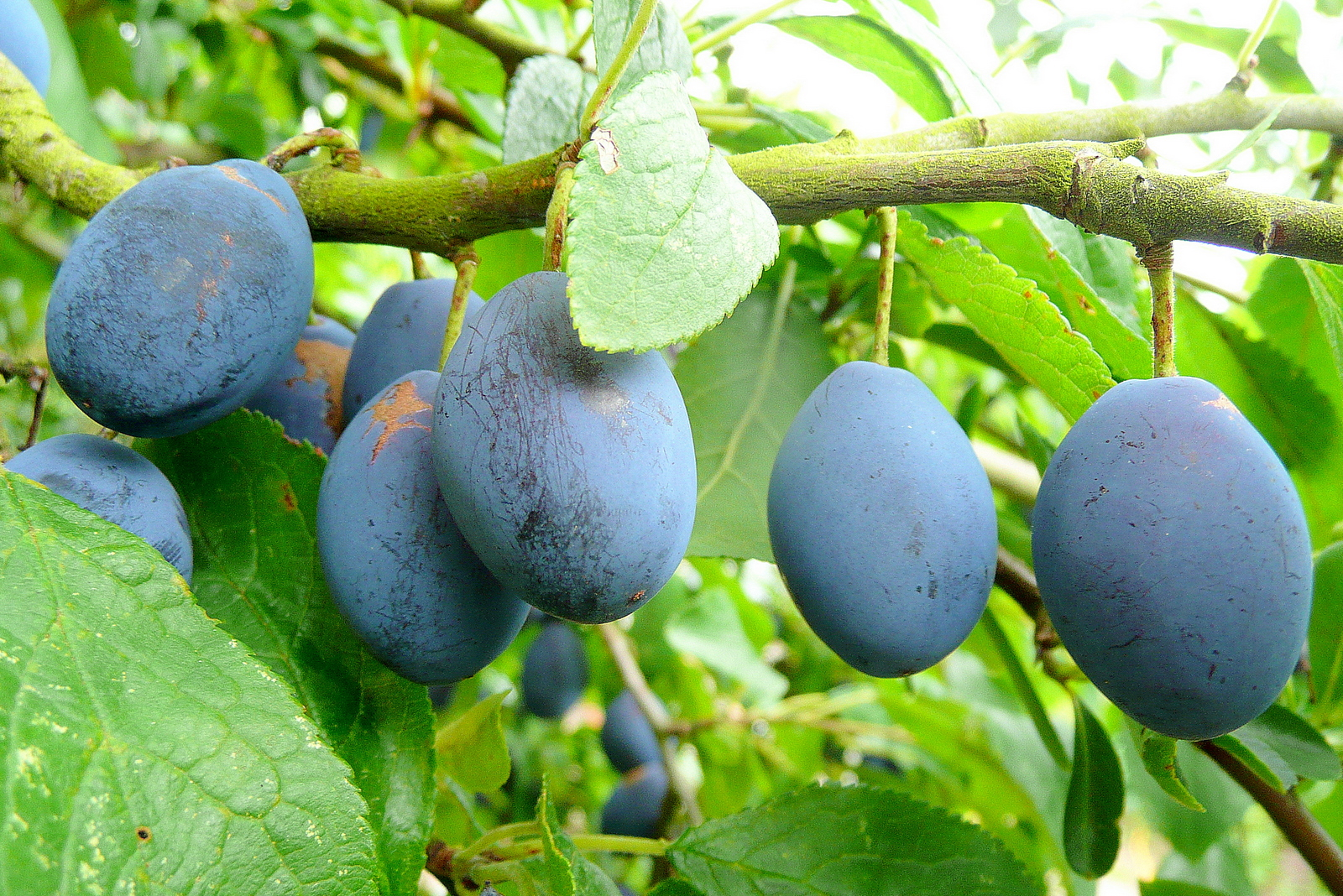
- Ripe damsons

Scientific classification
- Kingdom: Plantae
- Clade: Tracheophytes
- Clade: Angiosperms
- Clade: Eudicots
- Clade: Rosids
- Order: Rosales
- Family: Rosaceae
- Genus: Prunus
- Section: Prunus sect. Prunus
- Species: P. domestica
- Subspecies: P. d. subsp. insititia

Trinomial name
- Prunus domestica subsp. insititia (L.) C.K.Schneid.

= Damson =

Edible fruit

The damson (/ˈdæmzən/), damson plum, or damascene (Prunus domestica subsp. insititia, sometimes Prunus insititia), is an edible drupaceous fruit, a subspecies of the plum tree. Varieties of insititia are found across Europe, but the name damson is derived from and most commonly applied to forms that are native to Great Britain. Damsons are small, ovoid, plum-like fruit with a distinctive, somewhat astringent taste, and are widely used for culinary purposes, particularly in fruit preserves and jams.

In South and Southeast Asia, the term damson plum sometimes refers to jamblang, the fruit from a tree in the family Myrtaceae. The name "mountain damson" or "bitter damson" was also formerly applied in Jamaica to the tree Simarouba amara. Terminalia microcarpa and Chrysophyllum oliviforme are also sometimes referred to as damson plums.

== History ==
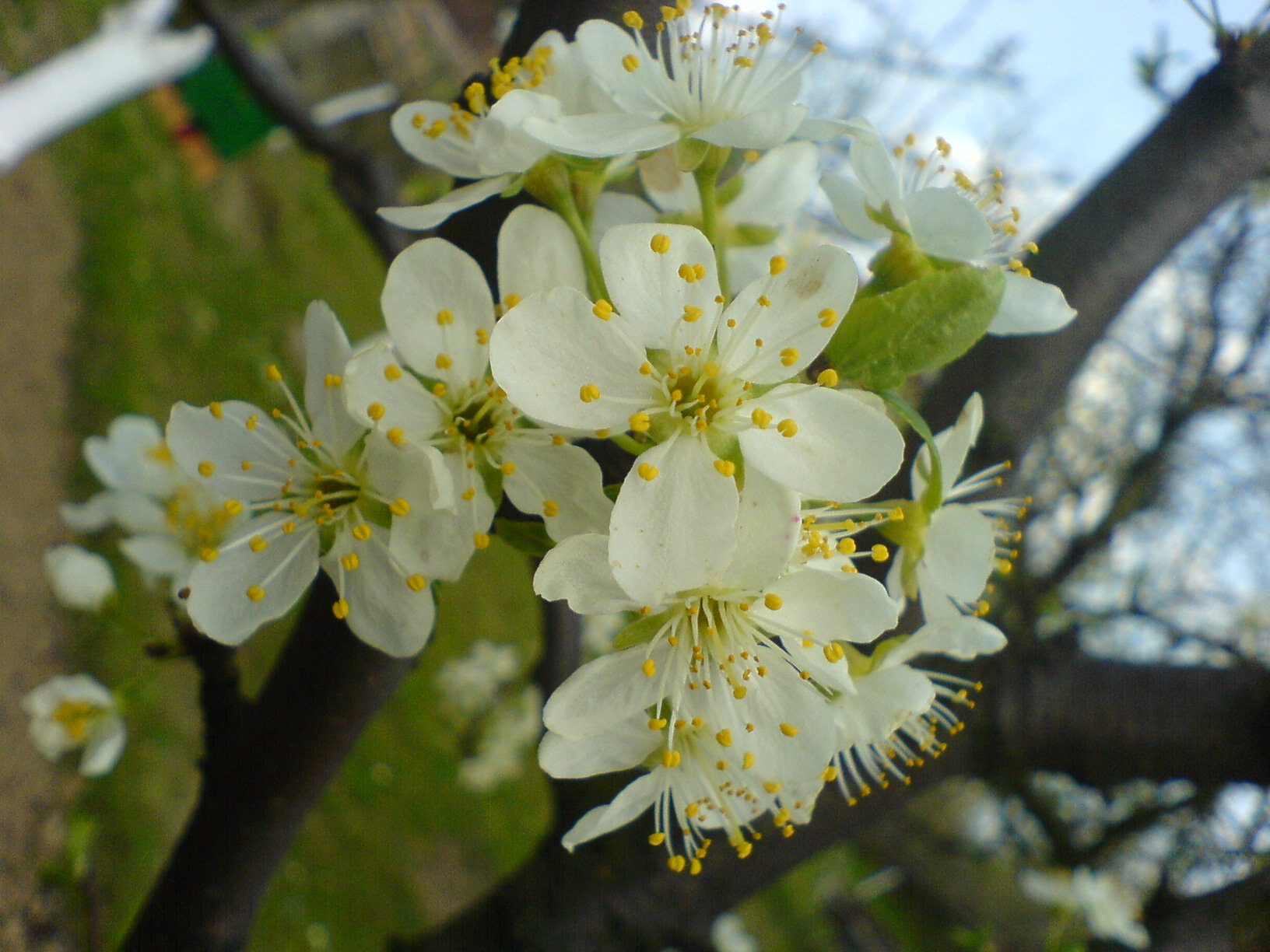
Damson flowers

The name damson comes from Middle English damascene, damesene, damasin, damsin, and ultimately from the Latin (prunum) damascenum, "plum of Damascus". One commonly stated theory is that damsons were first cultivated in antiquity in the area around the ancient city of Damascus, capital of modern-day Syria, and were introduced into England by the Romans. The historical link between the Roman-era damascenum and the north and west European damson is rather tenuous despite the adoption of the older name. The damascenum described by Roman and Greek authors of late antiquity has more of the character of a sweet dessert plum, not fitting well to the damson plum. Remnants of damsons are sometimes found during archaeological digs of ancient Roman camps across England, and they have clearly been cultivated, and consumed, for centuries. Damson stones have been found in an excavation in Hungate, York, and dated to the late period of Anglo-Saxon England.

The exact origin of Prunus domestica subsp. insititia is not known with certainty. It is often thought to have arisen in wild crosses, possibly in Asia Minor, between the sloe, Prunus spinosa, and the cherry plum, Prunus cerasifera. Despite this, tests on cherry plums and damsons have indicated that it is possible that the damson developed directly from forms of sloe, perhaps via the round-fruited varieties known as bullaces, and that the cherry plum did not play a role in its parentage. Insititia plums of various sorts, such as the German Kriechenpflaume or French quetsche, occur across Europe and the word "damson" is sometimes used to refer to them in English, but many of the English varieties from which the name "damson" was originally taken have both a different typical flavour and pear-shaped (pyriform) appearance compared with continental forms. Robert Hogg commented that "the Damson seems to be a fruit peculiar to England. We do not meet with it abroad, nor is any mention of it made in any of the pomological works or nurseryman's catalogues on the Continent". As time progressed, a distinction developed between the varieties known as "damascenes" and the (usually smaller) types called "damsons", to the degree that by 1891 they were the subject of a lawsuit when a Nottinghamshire grocer complained about being supplied one when he had ordered the other.

In addition to providing fruit, the damson makes a tough hedge or windbreak, and it became the favoured hedging tree in certain parts of the country such as Shropshire and Kent. Elsewhere damsons were used in orchards to protect less hardy trees, though orchards entirely composed of damson trees were a feature of some areas, notably the Lyth Valley of Westmorland and the Teme Valley in the Malverns, and indeed damsons were the only plum planted commercially north of Norfolk.

There is a body of anecdotal evidence that damsons were used in the British dye and cloth manufacturing industries in the 18th and 19th centuries, with examples occurring in every major damson-growing area (Buckinghamshire, Cheshire, Westmorland, Shropshire and Worcestershire). Stories that damsons were used to dye khaki army uniforms are particularly common. However, a 2005 report for conservancy body English Nature could find no documentary evidence within the dyeing industry that damsons were ever a source of dye, noting that use of natural dyes declined rapidly after the 1850s, and concluded that "there seems no evidence that damsons were used extensively or techniques [for using them] developed". The main recorded use of damsons in the industrial era was in commercial jam-making, and orchards were widespread until the Second World War, after which changing tastes, the effect of wartime sugar rationing, and the relatively high cost of British-grown fruit caused a steep decline.

The damson was introduced into the American colonies by English settlers before the American Revolution. It was regarded as thriving better in the continental United States than other European plum varieties; many of the earliest references to European plums in American gardens concern the damson. A favourite of early colonists, the tree has escaped from gardens and can be found growing wild in states such as Idaho.

== Characteristics ==
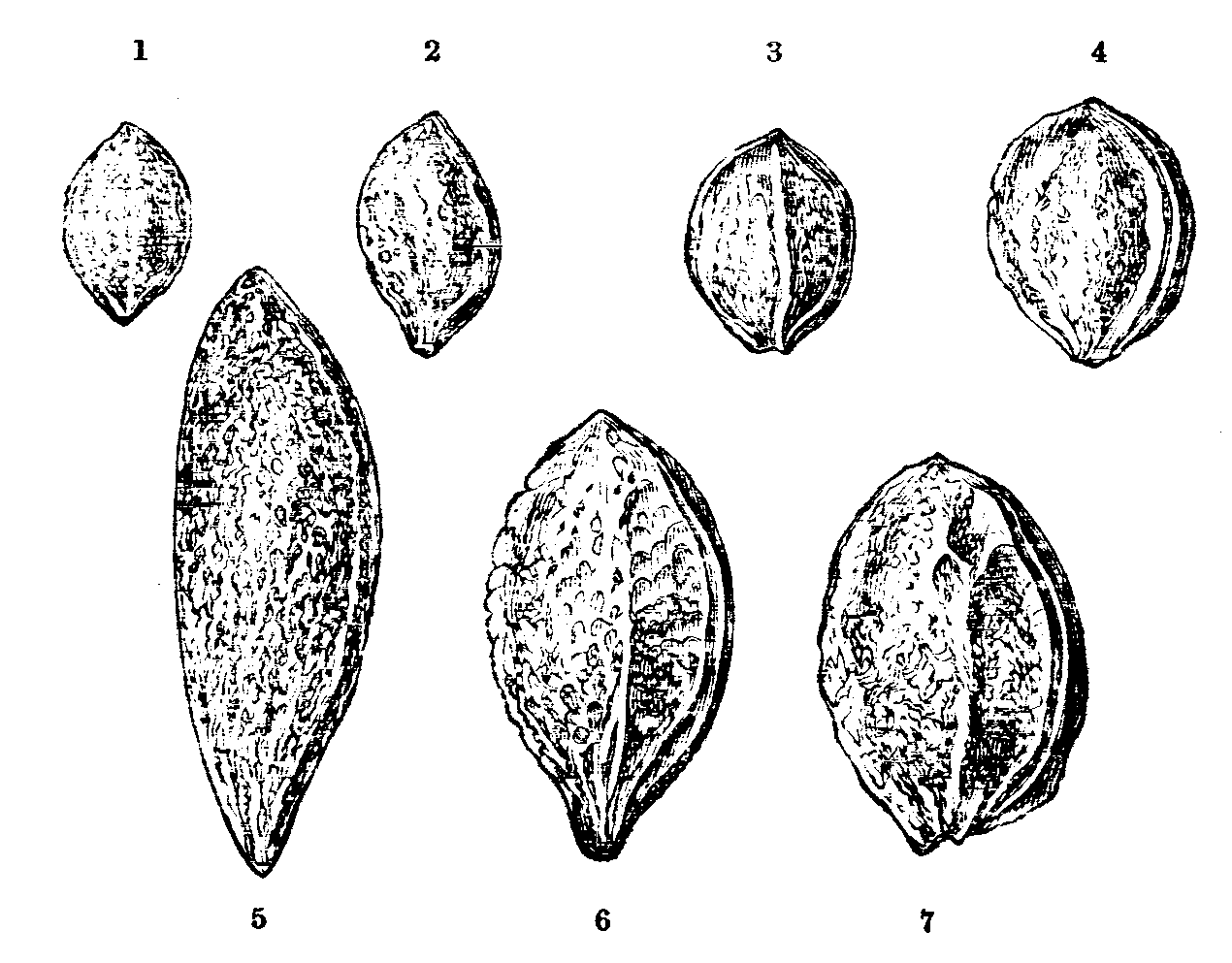
Comparison of plum stones: Shropshire damson shown top row, second from left (no. 2). From Charles Darwin's Variation of Animals and Plants under Domestication

The main characteristic of the damson is its distinctive rich flavour; unlike other plums it is both high in sugars and highly astringent. The fruit of the damson can also be identified by its shape, which is usually ovoid and slightly pointed at one end, or pyriform; its smooth-textured yellow-green flesh; and its skin, which ranges from dark blue to indigo to near-black depending on the variety (other types of Prunus domestica can have purple, yellow or red skin). Most damsons are of the "clingstone" type, where the flesh adheres to the stone. The damson is broadly similar to the semi-wild bullace, also classified as ssp. insititia, which is a smaller but invariably round plum with purple or yellowish-green skin. Damsons generally have a deeply furrowed stone, unlike bullaces, and unlike prunes cannot be successfully dried. Most individual damson varieties can be conclusively identified by examining the fruit's stone, which varies in shape, size and texture.

The tree blossoms with small, white flowers in early April in the Northern hemisphere and fruit is harvested from late August to September or October, depending on the cultivar.

== Cultivars ==
Several cultivars have been selected, and some are found in Great Britain, Ireland and the United States. There are still relatively few varieties of damson, with The Garden recording no more than "eight or nine varieties" in existence at the end of the 19th century; some are self-fertile and can reproduce from seed as well as by grafting. The cultivars 'Farleigh Damson' and 'Prune Damson' have gained the Royal Horticultural Society's Award of Garden Merit.

- 'Farleigh Damson' (syn. 'Crittenden's Prolific', 'Strood Cluster') is named after the village of East Farleigh in Kent, where it was raised by James Crittenden in the early 19th century. An 1871 letter to the Journal of horticulture and practical gardening claimed that the original seedling had been found by a Mr. Herbert, the tenant of a market garden in Strood, who had given it to Crittenden. It has small, roundish, black fruit, with a blue bloom, and is a very heavy bearer. Its heavy cropping led to it being widely planted in England.

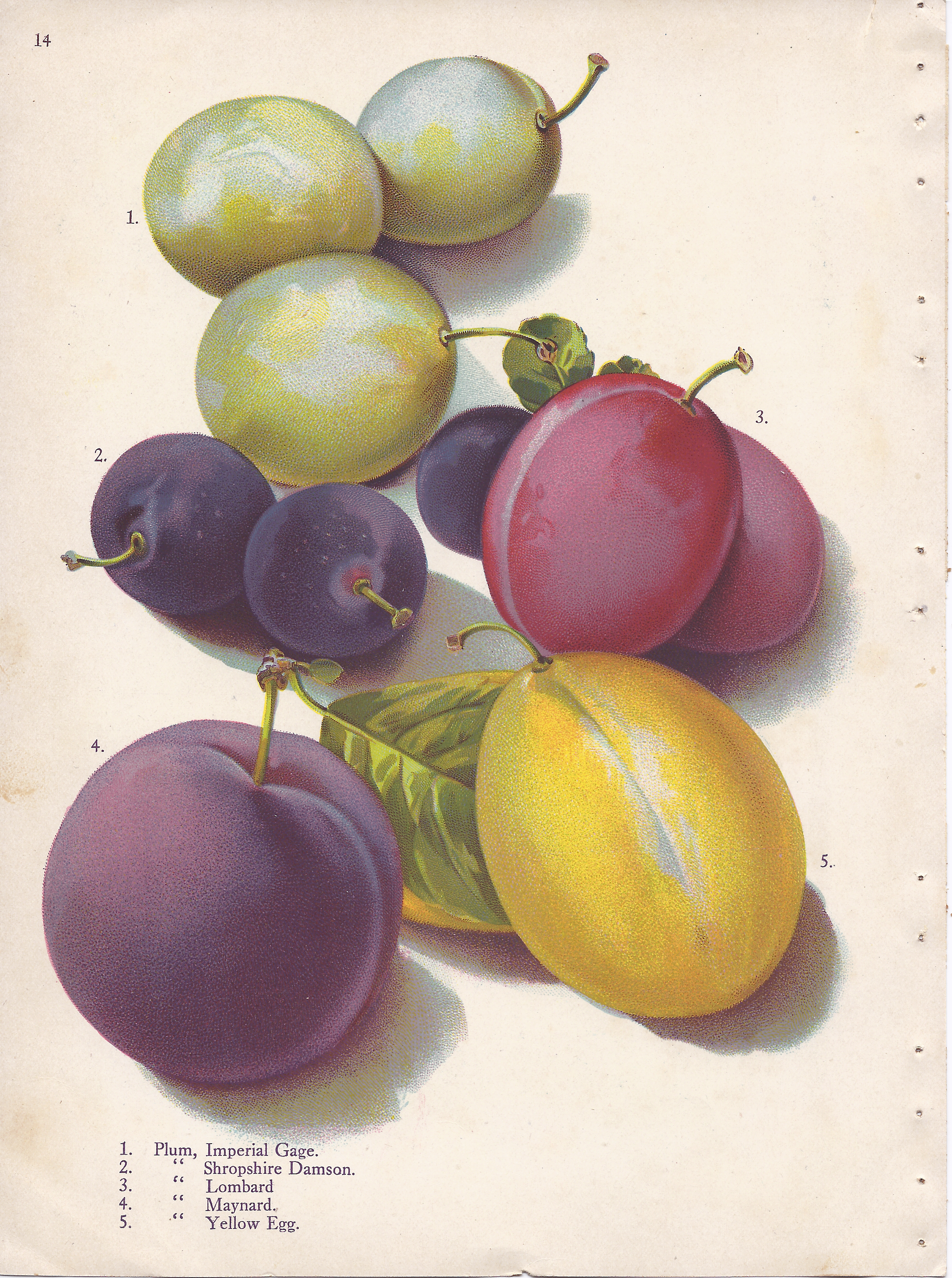
Shropshire Damson, shown at centre left. Other plums shown are Imperial Gage (labelled 1), Lombard (3), Maynard (4) and Yellow Egg (5).

- 'Shropshire Prune' (syn. 'Prune Damson', 'Long Damson', 'Damascene', 'Westmoreland Damson', 'Cheshire Damson') is a very old variety; its blue-purple, ovoid fruit has a distinctively "full rich astringent" flavour considered superior to other damsons, and it was thought particularly suitable for canning. Hogg states that this was the variety that became specifically associated with the old name "damascene". The local types often known as the "Westmoreland Damson" and "Cheshire Damson" are described as synonymous with the Shropshire Prune by the horticulturalist Harold Taylor and others. The Shropshire was also the best-known variety of damson in the United States.
- Similar to the Shropshire Prune and possibly part of the same landrace, 'Aylesbury Prune' (syn. 'Bucks Prune', 'Michaelmas Prune') is a semi-wild plum of damson type from the area of Buckinghamshire and Berkshire centred on Ivinghoe. It is relatively large-fruited and was considered by growers to have a high resistance to silver leaf, although was reputed to be poor for canning. Along with the Victoria plum, the Aylesbury Prune was one of the parents of the culinary plum 'Laxton's Cropper'. Although orchards of the Aylesbury Prune are now rare, Aylesbury Vale District Council has made efforts to conserve it.
- 'Frogmore' is a cultivar first grown in the 19th century in the Royal Gardens at Frogmore, where it was raised by head gardener Thomas Ingram. It described as having sweet, round-oval, purplish black fruit, which ripen in early September.
- 'King of the Damsons' (syn. 'Bradley's King') is a Nottinghamshire late-season variety, making a vigorous and spreading tree with foliage that turns a distinctive yellow in autumn. It was first distributed by Bradley & Sons of Halam in around 1880. The medium to large, obovoid purple fruit is relatively sweet with dryish flesh.
- 'Merryweather' is a popular 20th century cultivar, introduced by the firm of Henry Merryweather & Sons of Southwell, Nottinghamshire in 1907. The tree's parentage is unknown; it has leaves well above the size of other damsons, and is thought to have at least some culinary plum ancestry. The fruit is deep blue, large, and noticeably sweet when ripe, although having genuine damson astringency.
- 'Early Rivers', registered in 1871, was raised by Rivers Nursery from a seed of the variety St Etienne, and has roundish fruit with a chalky bloom. The small, red-purple clingstone damsons ripen as early as mid-August: they have juicy flesh but lack "true damson flavour".
- 'Blue Violet' originated in Westmoreland (likely as a hybrid or development of 'Shropshire Prune') and was first sent to the National Fruit Trials in the 1930s. An early variety, fruiting in August, it was long thought to have been lost but a few trees were discovered in the Lake District in 2007.
- 'Common Damson' (syn. 'Small Round Damson') was a traditional cultivar with small, black fruit, being probably very close to wild specimens. It had a mealy texture and acid flavour, and by the 1940s it was no longer planted.

A type of damson once widely grown in County Armagh, Ireland, was never definitely identified but generally known as the Armagh damson; its fruit were particularly well regarded for canning. Local types of English prune such as the Gloucestershire 'Old Pruin', are sometimes described as damson varieties.

== White damson ==
Although the majority of damson varieties are blue-black or purple in colour, there are at least two now-rare forms of "white damson", both having green or yellow-green skin. The National Fruit Collection has accessions of the "White Damson (Sergeant)" and the larger "White Damson (Taylor)", both of which may first have been mentioned in the 1620s.

To confuse matters, the White Bullace was in the past sold in London markets under the name of "white damson". Bullaces can usually be distinguished from damsons by their spherical shape, relatively smooth stones, and poorer flavour, and generally ripen up to a month later in the year than damsons.

== Uses ==
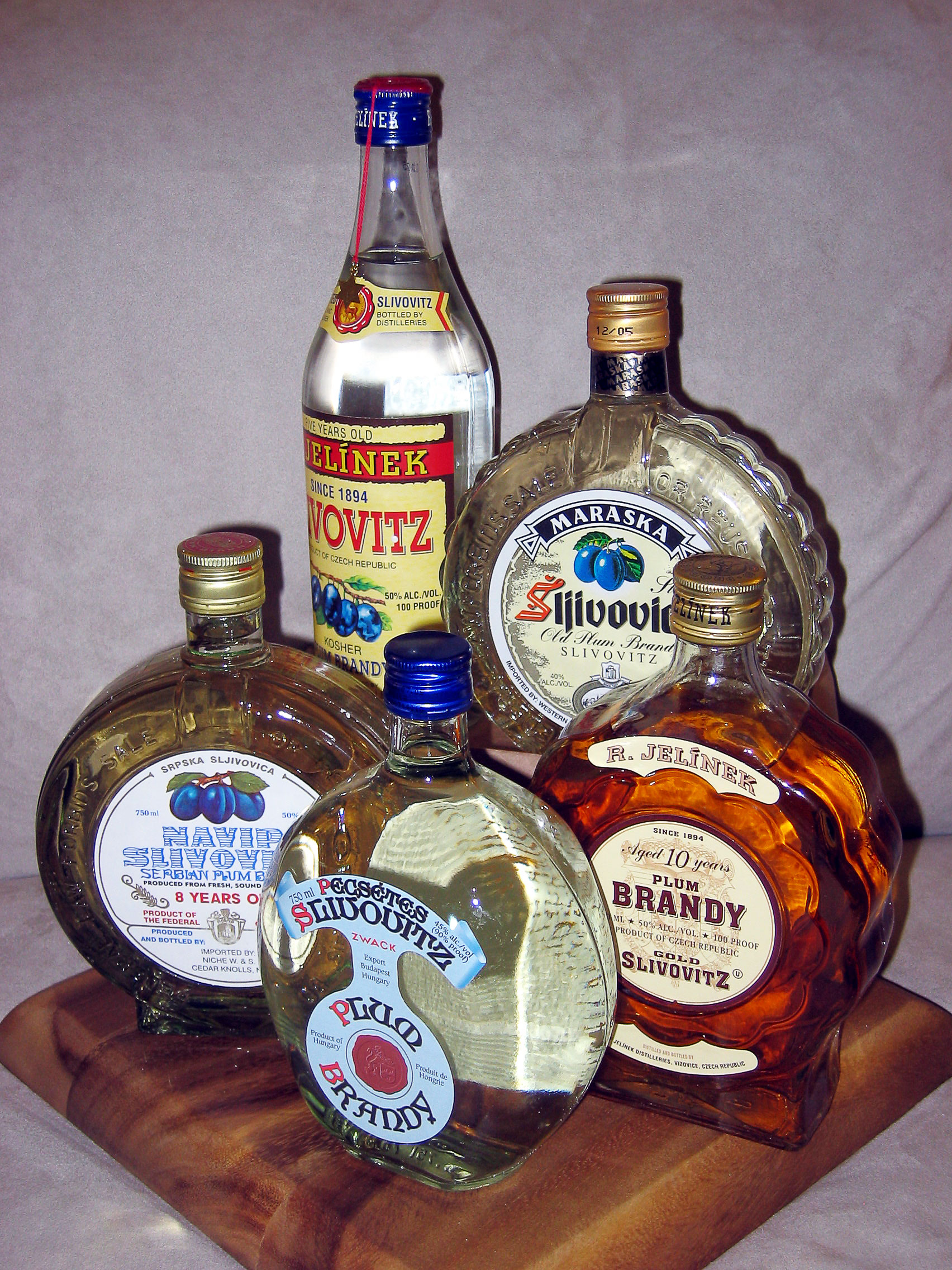
Slivovitz is a distilled beverage made from damson plums.

The skin of the damson can have a very tart flavour, particularly when unripe (the term "damson" is often used to describe red wines with rich yet acidic plummy flavours). The fruit is therefore most often used for cooking, and is commercially grown for preparation in jam and other fruit preserves. Some varieties of damson, however, such as "Merryweather", are sweet enough to eat directly from the tree, and most are palatable raw if allowed to fully ripen. They can also be pickled, canned, or otherwise preserved.

Because damson stones may be difficult and time-consuming to separate from the flesh, preserves, such as jam or fruit butter, are often made from whole fruit. Most cooks then remove the stones, but others, either in order not to lose any of the pulp or because they believe the flavour is better, leave the stones in the final product. A limited number of damson stones left in jam is supposed to impart a subtle almond flavour, though as with all plums damson stones contain the cyanogenic glycoside amygdalin, a toxin.

Damson gin is made in a similar manner to sloe gin, although less sugar is necessary as the damsons are sweeter than sloes. Insititia varieties similar to damsons are used to make slivovitz, a distilled plum spirit made in Slavic countries. Damson wine was once common in England: a 19th-century reference said that "good damson wine is, perhaps, the nearest approach to good port that we have in England. No currant wine can equal it".
