= Prue =

Prue may refer to:

== People ==
=== Given name ===
Prue is a feminine given name, sometimes a short form of Prudence or Prunella.

- Prue Acton, Australian fashion designer
- Prue Barron (1917–2014), British surgeon and geriatrician
- Prue Car, Australian politician
- Prue Hyman, New Zealand feminist economist and former cricketer
- Prue Leith, South African chef living in the UK
- Prue MacSween, Australian journalist
- Prue O'Donovan, Australian priest
- Prue Sibree, Australian politician
- Prue Watt, Australian Paralympic swimmer

=== Surname ===
- Jarrad Prue, Australian basketball player
- Michael Prue (born 1948), Canadian politician
- Sally Prue, British novelist
- Terry Prue, Australian Test umpire

== Other uses ==
- Prue, Oklahoma, a town in the United States
- List of gliders § Prue, various gliders designed and built by Irving Prue

== See also ==
- Prue Yai, sub-district of Khukhan District, Sisaket Province, Thailand
- Pru (disambiguation)
- Proulx
