= Pru =

Pru or PRU may refer to:

- Peru, ITU country code PRU
- Provincial Reconnaissance Unit a South Vietnamese paramilitary unit
- Prudence (given name)
- Prunella (given name)
- Prudencesa Renfro, American singer
- Prudential Tower or Pru, Boston, Massachusetts, US
- Prudential plc or The Pru, a UK financial company
- Prudential Financial, stock symbol
- Pru (album), 2000
- Pru (band), Thai
- Pru District
- Pru (Ghana parliament constituency)
- Prudhoe railway station, station code
- No. 1 Photographic Reconnaissance Unit RAF, 1 PRU
- Pupil Referral Unit, UK, for children unable to attend school
- Perseus Mining, ASX stock ticker symbol PRU

== See also ==
- Prue (disambiguation)
