= Prunella =

Prunella may refer to:

== Arts and entertainment ==
- Prunella (fairy tale), an Italian fairy tale
- Prunella, a 1913 play in the United States with Marguerite Clark
- Prunella (film), a 1918 silent film

== Plants and animals ==
- Prunella (bird), also known as accentors or dunnocks, a bird genus
- Prunella (plant), also known as self-heal, a plant genus
- Prunella (grape), a French wine grape better known as Cinsaut

== Other uses ==
- Prunella (given name)
- Prunella (horse), a Thoroughbred racehorse and broodmare
- Prunella (cloth), an 18th-century worsted fabric
- Bargnolino, sometimes called prunella, Italian sloe gin
