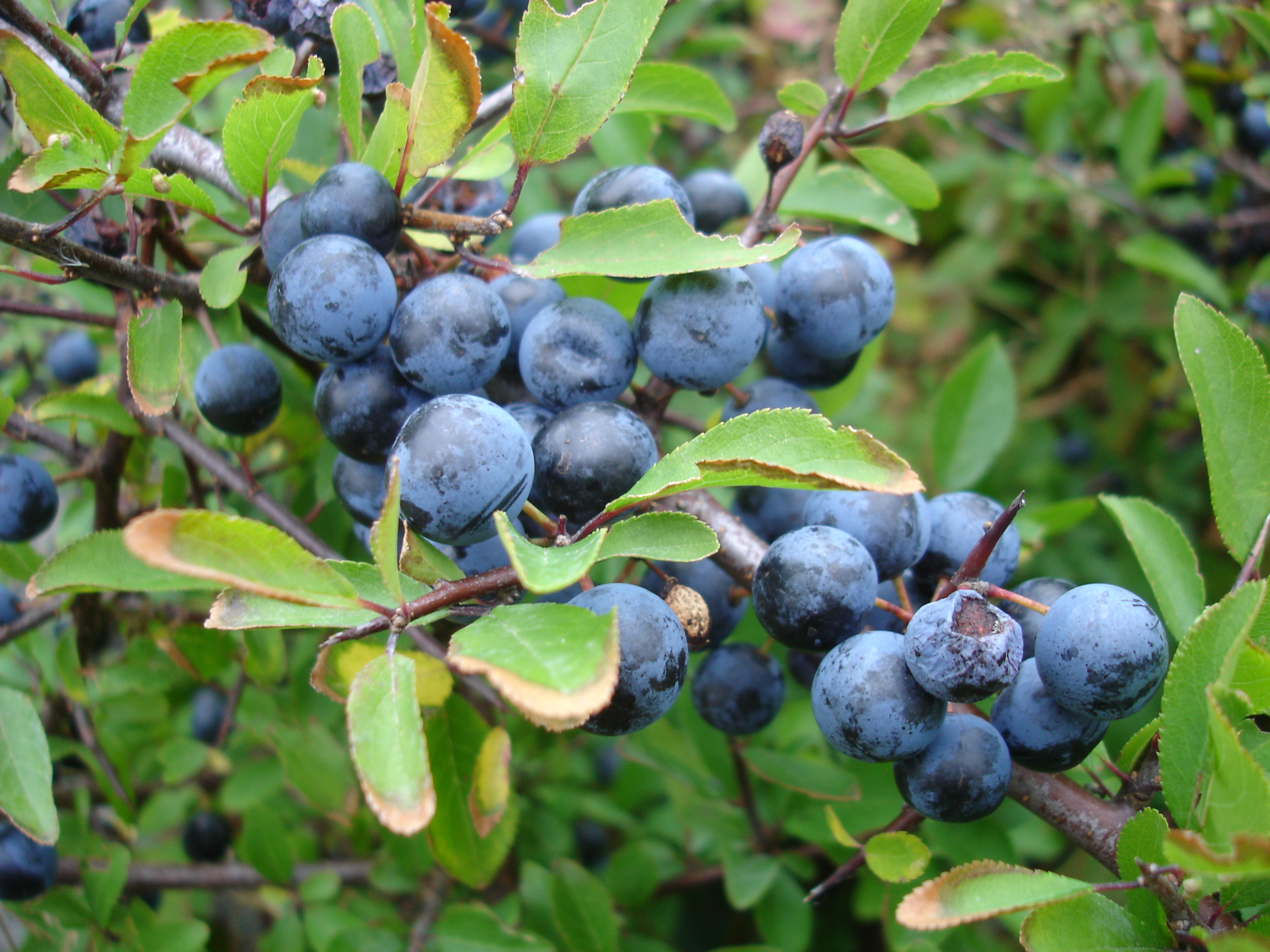
- Fruit

Conservation status
- Least Concern (IUCN 3.1)

Scientific classification
- Kingdom: Plantae
- Clade: Tracheophytes
- Clade: Angiosperms
- Clade: Eudicots
- Clade: Rosids
- Order: Rosales
- Family: Rosaceae
- Genus: Prunus
- Subgenus: Prunus subg. Prunus
- Section: Prunus sect. Prunus
- Species: P. spinosa

Binomial name
- Prunus spinosa L.
- Distribution map

Synonyms
- List: Druparia spinosa (Clairv.); Prunus acacia (Crantz); Prunus acacia (Crantz ex Poir.); Prunus acacia-germanica (Crantz); Prunus amygdaliformis (Pau); Prunus approximata (Giraudias); Prunus communis var. spinosa ((L.) Hook. & Arn.); Prunus domestica var. spinosa ((L.) Kuntze); Prunus ericiflora (A.Sav.); Prunus erythrocalyx (Clav.); Prunus erythrocalyx var. rubella (Clav.); Prunus foecundissima (Clav.); Prunus glomerata (A.Sav.); Prunus insititia var. spinosa ((L.) Weston); Prunus kurdica (Fenzl ex Fritsch); Prunus lucens (Sav.); Prunus lucida (Clav.); Prunus moldavica (Kotov); Prunus oxypyrena (Clav.); Prunus podolica Andrz.; Prunus praecox (Salisb.); Prunus rubella (Clav.); Prunus spinosa f. erythrocalyx ((Clavaud) Browicz & Ziel.); Prunus spinosa var. balearica (Willk.); Prunus spinosa var. erythrocalyx ((Clavaud) Rouy & E.G.Camus); Prunus spinosa var. oxypyrena ((Clavaud) Rouy & E.G.Camus); Prunus spinosa var. pubescens (Ficalho & Cout.); Prunus spinosa var. rubella ((Clavaud) Rouy & E.G.Camus); Prunus spinosa var. stenopetala ((Clavaud) Rouy & E.G.Camus); Prunus spinosa var. subcinerea (Cout.); Several other varieties of Prunus spinosa; Prunus stepposa (Kotov); Prunus subcylindrica (Sav.); Prunus subvillosa (Debeaux); Prunus vulgatior var. stenopetala (Clav.)

= Prunus spinosa =

Species of flowering plant in the rose family

Prunus spinosa, called blackthorn or sloe, is a species of flowering plant in the rose family, Rosaceae. It is native to Europe and West Asia, and has been naturalised in parts of North America.

The fruits are used to make sloe gin in Great Britain and patxaran in the Basque Country. The wood is used to make walking sticks, including the Irish shillelagh.

== Description ==
Prunus spinosa typically forms a large deciduous shrub, but can grow as a small tree up to 6 metres (20 ft) tall. It has blackish bark and dense, stiff, spiny branches that usually form a tangle. The leaves are oval, 2–4.5 centimetres (3/4–1 3/4 inches) long and 1.2–2 cm (1/2–3/4 in) broad, with a serrated margin. The flowers are about 1.5 cm (1/2 in) in diameter, with five creamy-white petals; they are produced shortly before the leaves in early spring, and are hermaphroditic and insect-pollinated. The fruit, called a "sloe", is a single-seeded drupe 10–12 millimetres (3/8–1/2 in) in diameter, black with a purple-blue waxy bloom, ripening in late autumn. The trees can live to 100 years.

In the United Kingdom, they are traditionally harvested in October or November, after the first frosts, as this makes the skin softer and easier to process into sloe gin. Sloes are thin-fleshed, with a very strongly astringent flavour when fresh. Its fruit persists for an average of 36.7 days. The fruit averages 77.6% water, and their dry weight includes 10.6% carbohydrates and 0.6% lipids.

Prunus spinosa has a tetraploid (2n=4x=32) set of chromosomes.

=== Similar species ===
Prunus spinosa is frequently confused with the related P. cerasifera (cherry plum), particularly in early spring when the latter starts flowering a month or more earlier than P. spinosa. They can be distinguished by flower size, around 15 mm P. spinosa, and 20 mm in P. cerasifera. In addition, the sepals are bent backwards in P. cerasifera, but not in P. spinosa. They can be distinguished in winter by the shrubbier habit with stiffer, wider-angled, grey-brown branches of P. spinosa (greenish, and flexible, in one-year-old shoots of P. cerasifera); in summer by the relatively narrower leaves of P. spinosa, more than twice as long as broad; and in autumn by the colour of the fruit skin purplish black in P. spinosa and yellow or red in P. cerasifera; the latter also ripens about two months earlier, in late summer or early autumn.

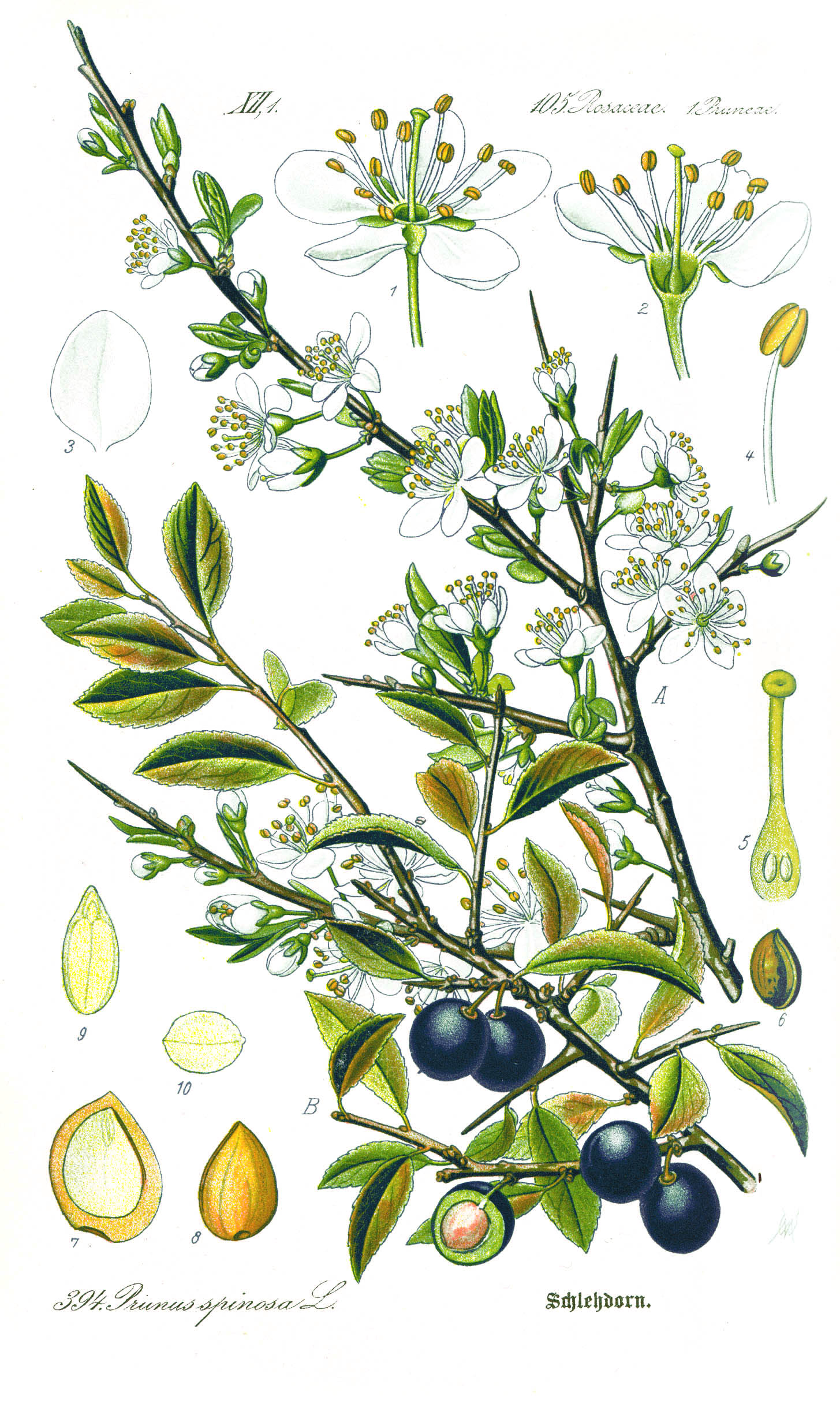
1885 illustration

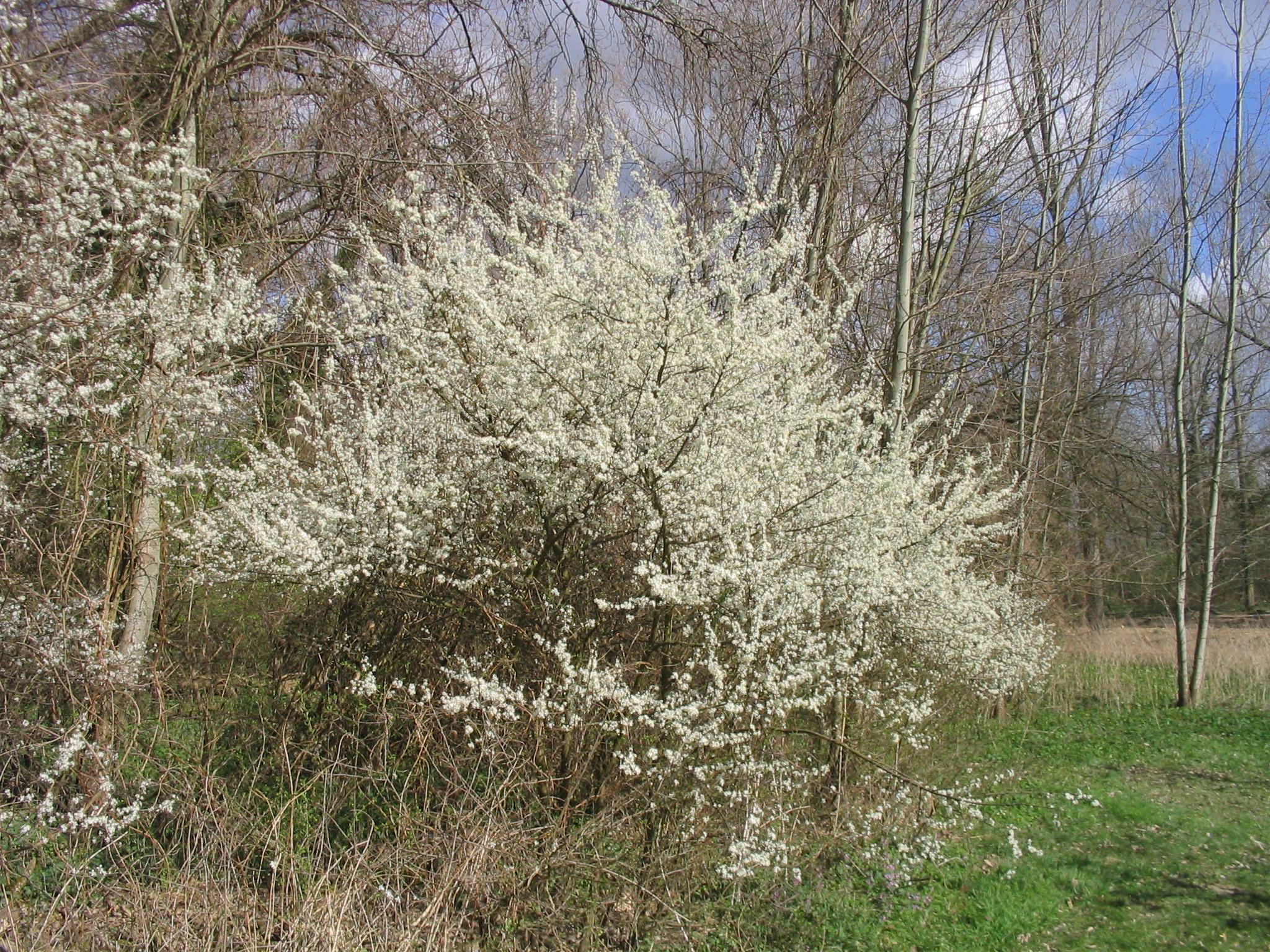
In early spring

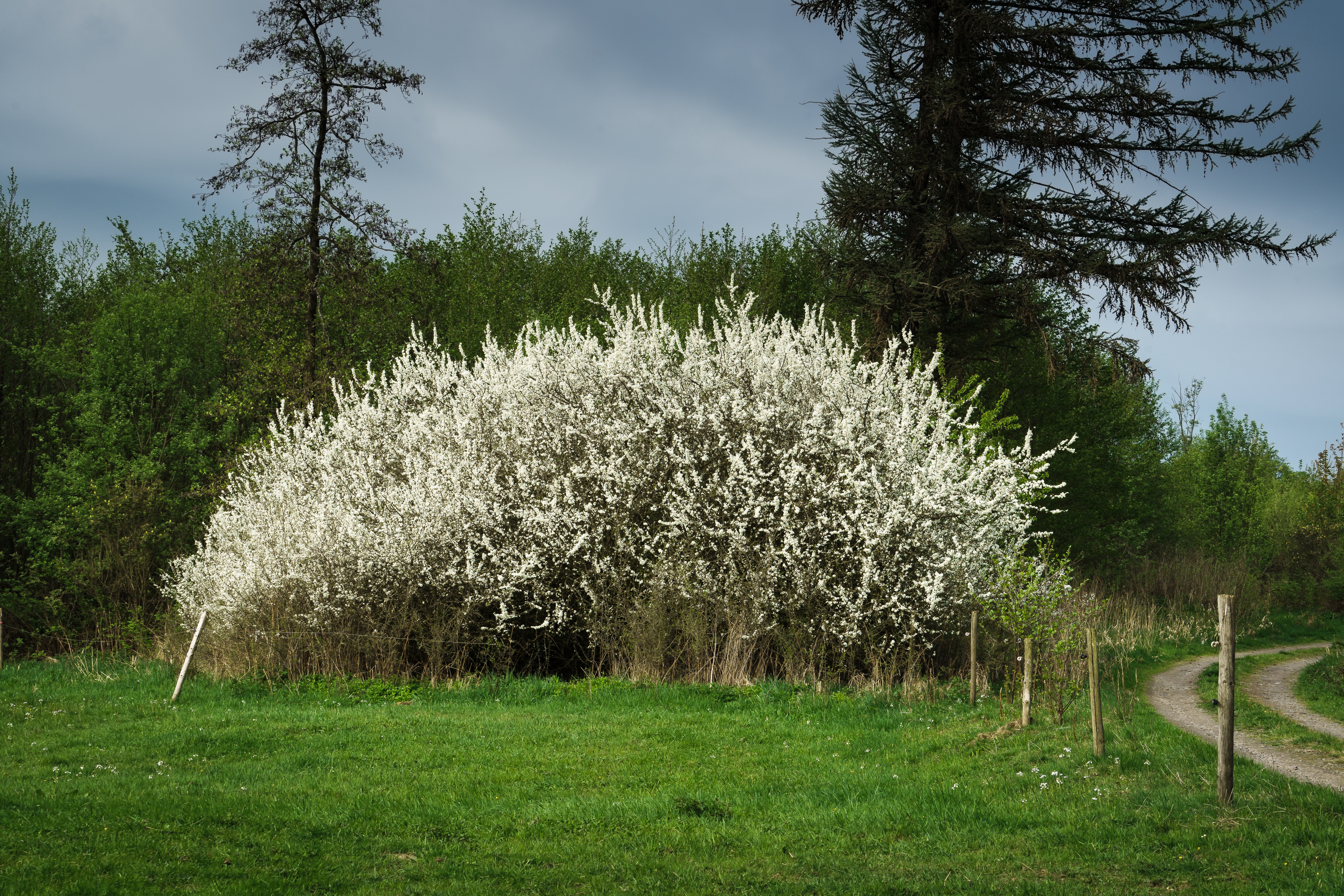
Shrub in the Vogelsberg

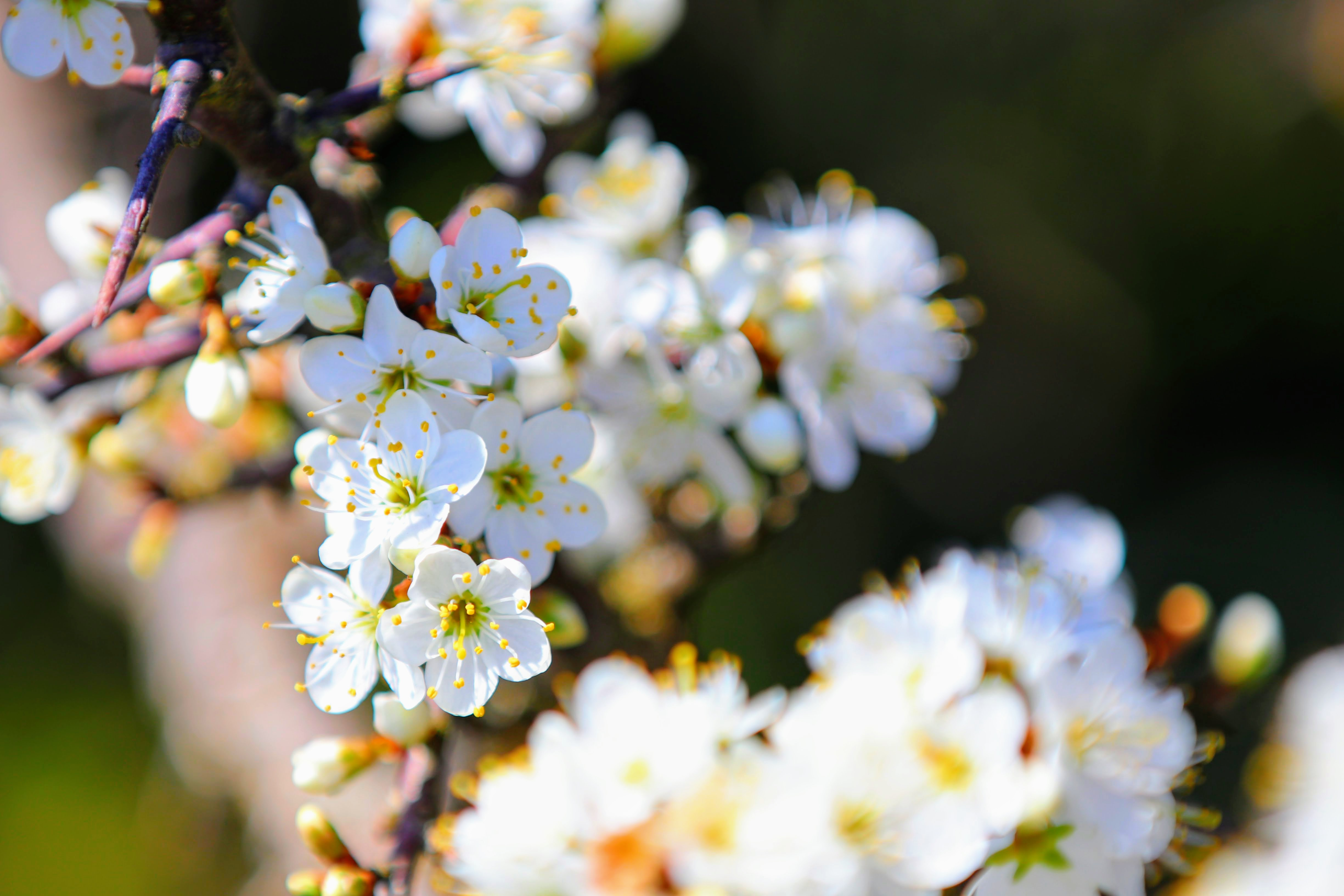
Close-up of flowers

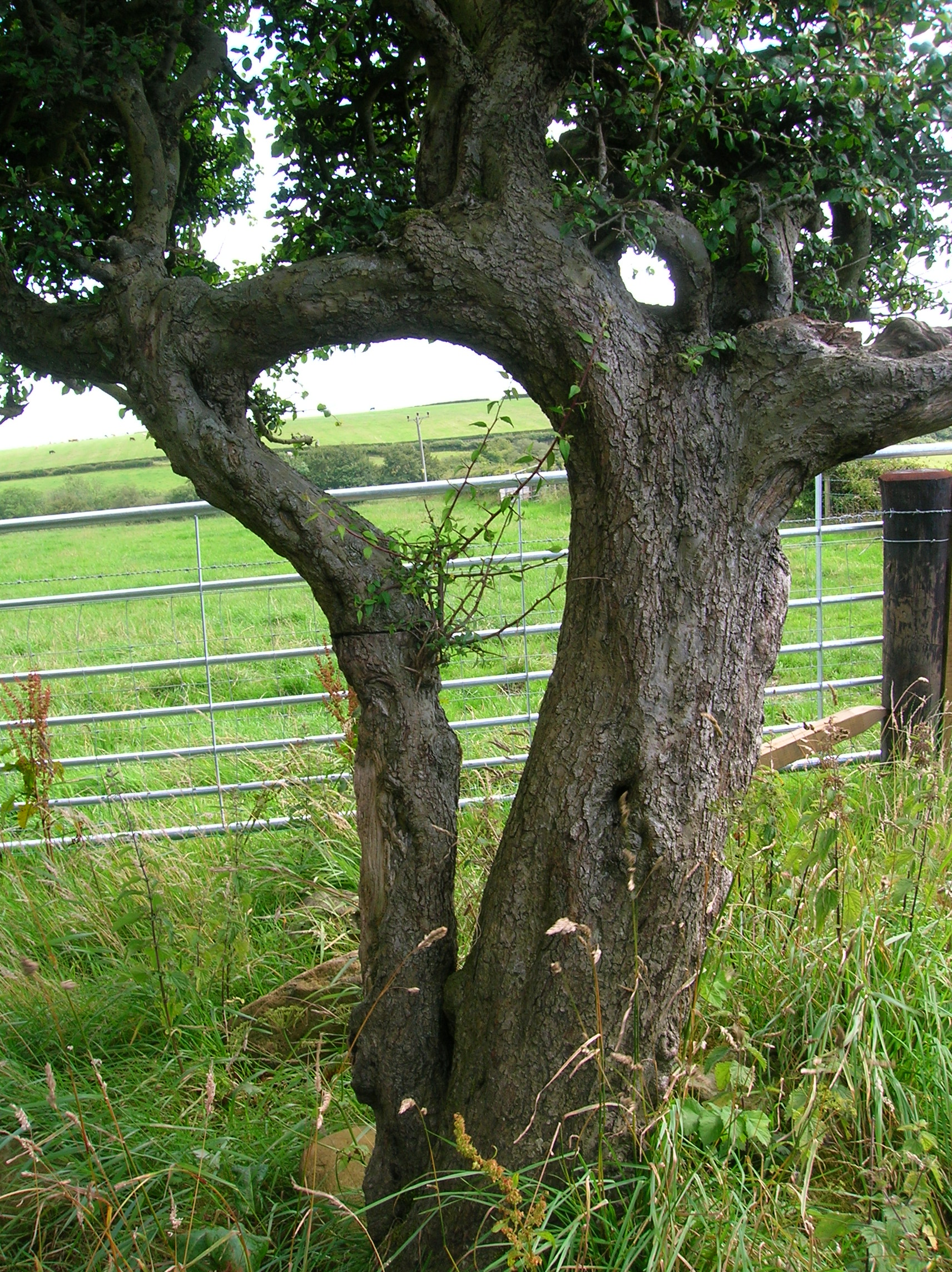
Inosculated tree branches

== Etymology ==
The specific name spinosa is a Latin term indicating the pointed and thornlike spur shoots characteristic of this species. The common name blackthorn is due to the thorny nature of the shrub, and possibly its very dark bark; it has a much darker bark than the whitethorn (hawthorn), to which it is contrasted.

The word commonly used for the fruit, sloe, comes from Old English slāh, cognate with Old High German slēha, slēwa, and Modern German schlehe. Other cognate forms are the Frisian and Middle Low German (Note: Both Frisian and Middle Low German were historically spoken in Lower Saxony.) slē, the Middle Dutch slee, slie, sleeu; the Modern Dutch slee; the Modern Low German slee/slē, slī; and the Danish slåen.

The names related to sloe come from the common Germanic root slaihwō, itself comparable to the Old Slavic, Bulgarian, Macedonian, Ukrainian and Russian слива (sliva, Ukrainian slyva), and the West Slavic/Polish śliwa, referring to a plum of any species, including sloe. The root śliwa tarnina is present in other Slavic languages, such as Bosnian, Bulgarian трънка, Croatian, Montenegrin and Serbian (šljiva/шљива).

== Distribution and habitat ==
P. spinosa is native to Europe, western Asia, and locally in northwest Africa. It is also locally naturalised in Tasmania and eastern North America.

== Ecology ==
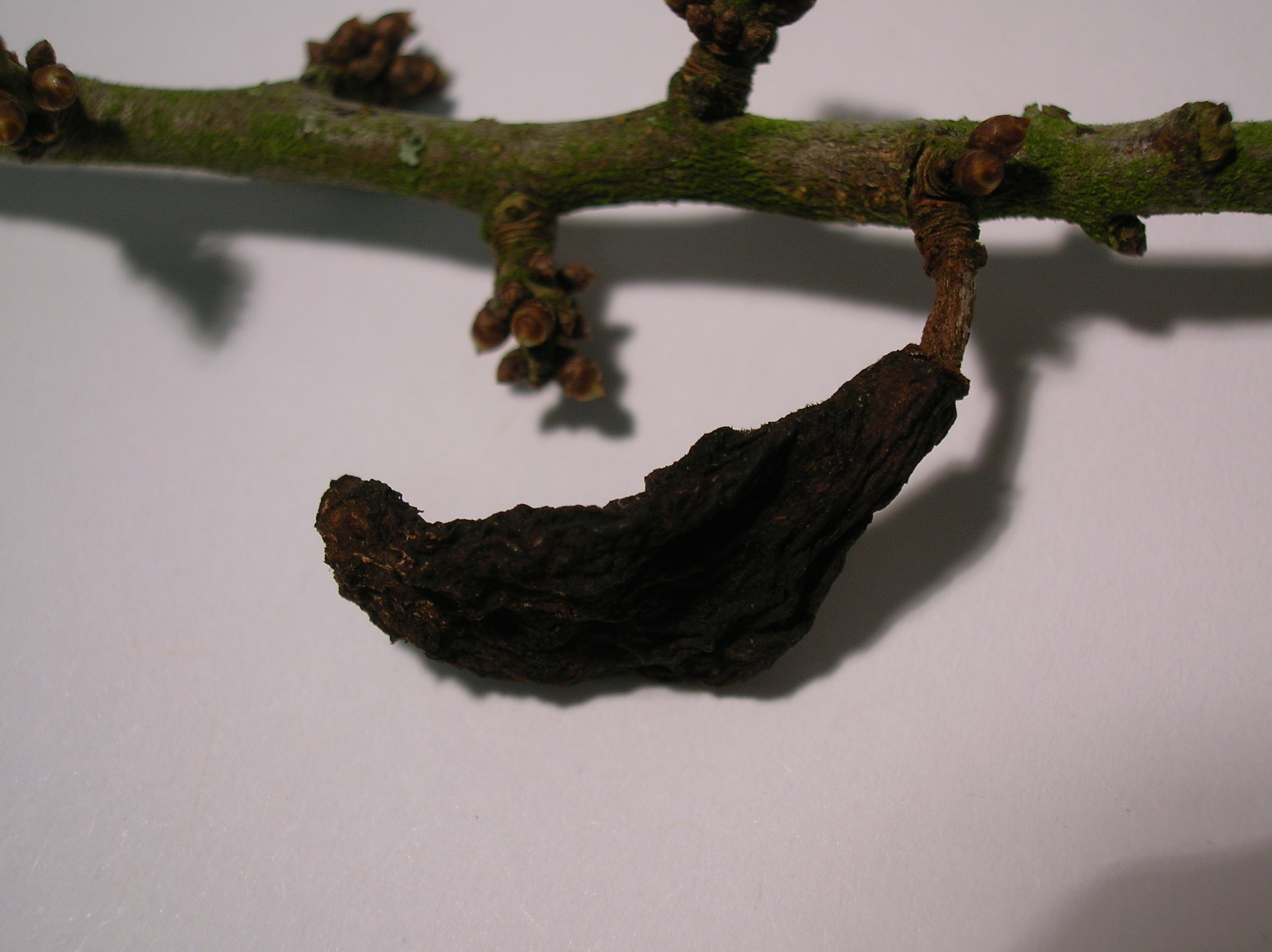
Pocket plum gall on blackthorn, caused by the fungus Taphrina pruni

The foliage is sometimes eaten by the larvae of Lepidoptera, including the small eggar moth, emperor moth, willow beauty, white-pinion spotted, common emerald, November moth, pale November moth, mottled pug, green pug, brimstone moth, feathered thorn, brown-tail, yellow-tail, short-cloaked moth, lesser yellow underwing, lesser broad-bordered yellow underwing, double square-spot, black hairstreak, brown hairstreak, hawthorn moth (Scythropia crataegella) and the case-bearer moth Coleophora anatipennella. Dead blackthorn wood provides food for the caterpillars of the concealer moth Esperia oliviella.

== Toxicity ==
Like many other stone fruit with stones, the seed in the stone contains trace amounts of hydrogen cyanide.

== Uses ==
The shrub, with its long, sharp thorns, is traditionally used in Britain and other parts of northern Europe to make a cattle-proof hedge.

The fruit is similar to a small damson or plum, suitable for preserves, but rather tart and astringent for eating fresh unless it is picked after the first few days of autumn frost. This effect can be reproduced by freezing harvested sloes. This kind of ripening is called bletting.

Since the plant is hardy, and grows in a wide range of conditions, it is used as a rootstock for many other species of plum, as well as some other fruit species.

=== Flavouring ===
The juice was used in the manufacture of fake port wine, and it was used as an adulterant to impart roughness to genuine port, into the early 20th century. In rural Britain a liqueur, sloe gin, is made by infusing gin with sloes and sugar; vodka can also be infused with sloes. Similarly, in Northern Greece, they make a blackthorn liqueur by infusing tsipouro with the fruit and adding sugar.

In Navarre, Spain, a popular liqueur called pacharán is made with sloes. In France a liqueur called troussepinette, or just épine or épinette, is made from the young shoots in spring (rather than from the fruit in autumn). (Vin d'épine, likewise, is an infusion of early shoots of blackthorn macerated with sugar in wine.) In Italy, the infusion of spirit with the fruit and sugar produces a liqueur called bargnolino (sometimes prunella). In France, eau de vie de prunelle[s] is distilled from fermented sloes in regions such as the Alsace. Wine made from fermented sloes is made in Britain, and in Germany and other central European countries. It is also sometimes used in the brewing of lambic beer in Belgium.

=== Culinary ===
Sloes can also be made into jam, chutney, and used in fruit pies. Sloes preserved in vinegar are similar in taste to Japanese umeboshi. The juice of the fruit dyes linen a reddish colour that washes out to a durable pale blue.

The leaves resemble tea leaves, and were used as an adulterant of tea.

The fruit stones have been found in Swiss lake dwellings. Early human use of sloes as food is evidenced in the case of the 5,300-year-old human mummy (nicknamed Ötzi), discovered in the Ötztal Alps along the Austrian-Italian border in 1991; a sloe was found near the remains, indicating that Ötzi intended to eat it before he died.

=== Wood ===
Blackthorn makes an excellent firewood that burns slowly with a good heat and little smoke. The wood takes a fine polish and is used for tool handles and canes. Straight blackthorn stems have traditionally been made into walking sticks or clubs (known in Ireland as a shillelagh). In the British Army, blackthorn sticks are carried by commissioned officers of the Royal Irish Regiment; this is a tradition also in Irish regiments in some Commonwealth countries.

=== Inks ===
Rashi, a Talmudist and Tanakh commentator of the High Middle Ages, writes that the sap (or gum) of P. spinosa (which he refers to as the prunellier) was used as an ingredient in the making of some inks used for manuscripts.

A "sloe-thorn worm" used as fishing bait is mentioned in the 15th-century work, The Treatyse of Fishing with an Angle.

== In culture ==
In the United Kingdom, the term 'blackthorn winter' is an old phrase originating in rural England to describe a cold period in early Spring when blackthorn is in flower.

The flowering of the blackthorn may have been associated with the ancient Celtic celebration of Imbolc, traditionally celebrated on February 1 in Ireland, Scotland and the Isle of Man.

In Middle English, slō was used to denote something of trifling value.

The expression "sloe-black eyes" for a person with dark eyes comes from the fruit, and is first attested in William Somervile's 1735 poem The Chace. Sloe-eyed, meanwhile, is first attested in A. J. Wilson's 1867 novel Vashti.

The name of the dark-coloured cloth prunella was derived from the French word prunelle, meaning 'sloe'.
