= Sloe gin =

Red liqueur made from gin and blackthorn drupes

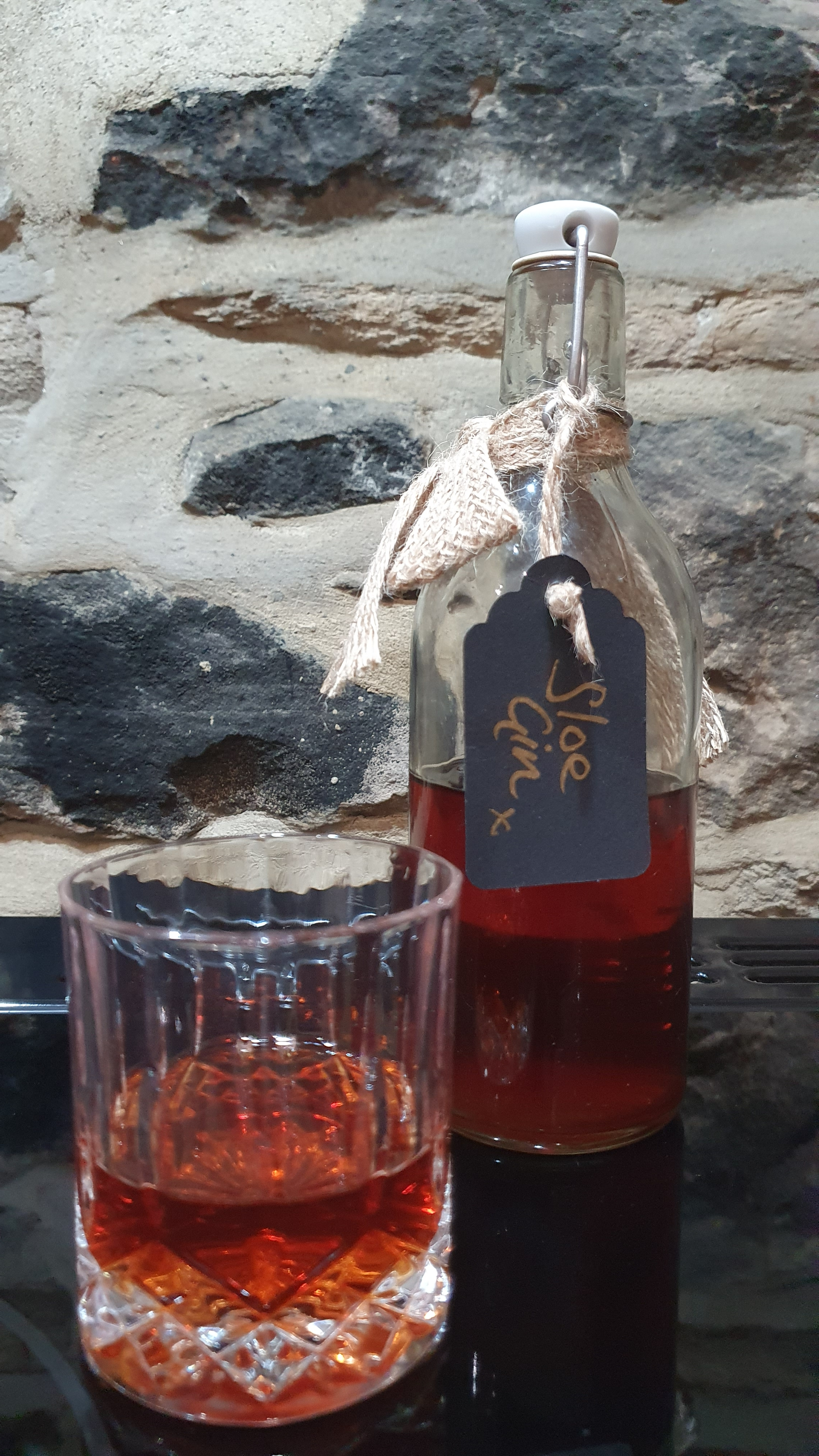
Home-made sloe gin

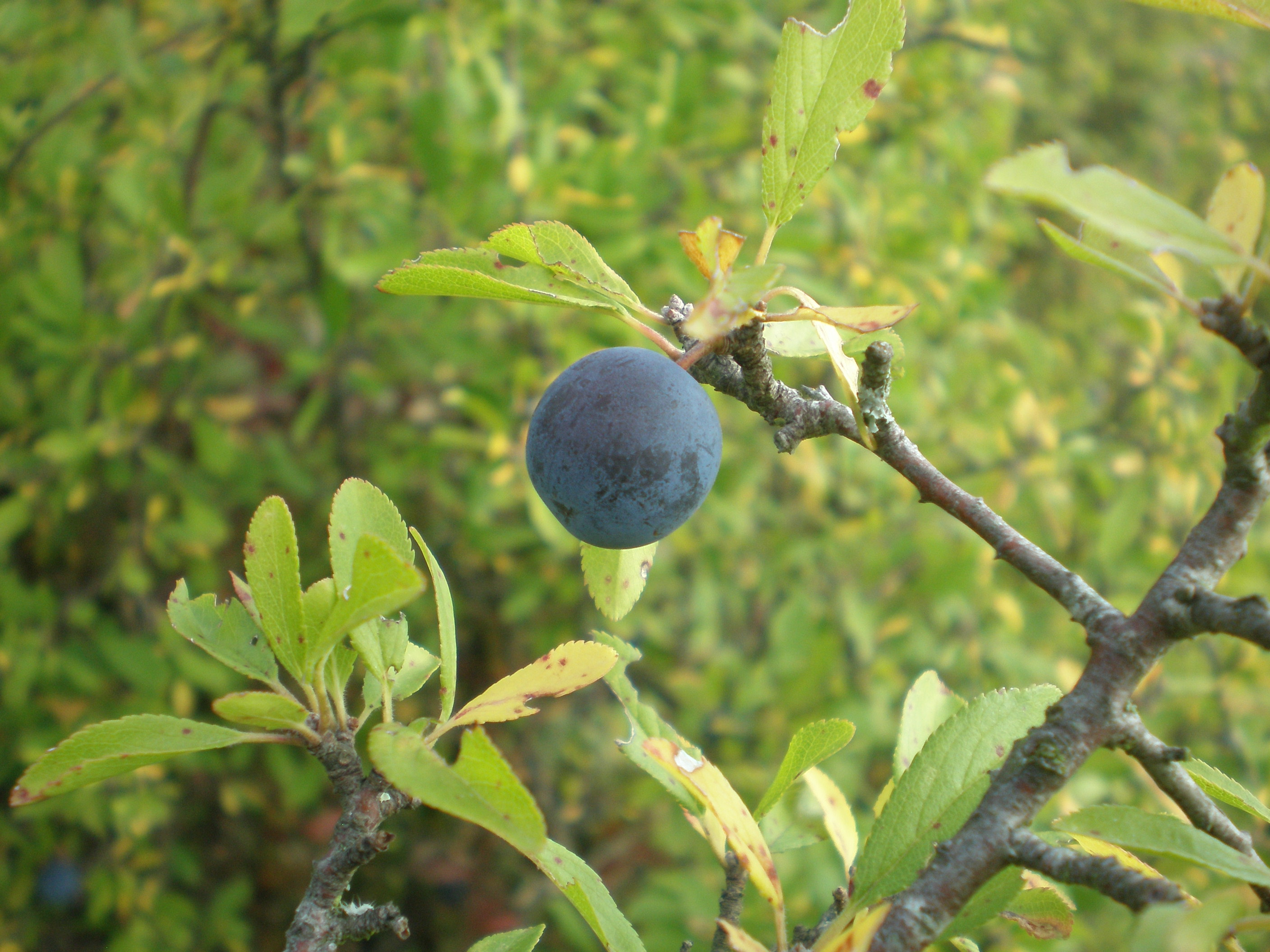
Sloe

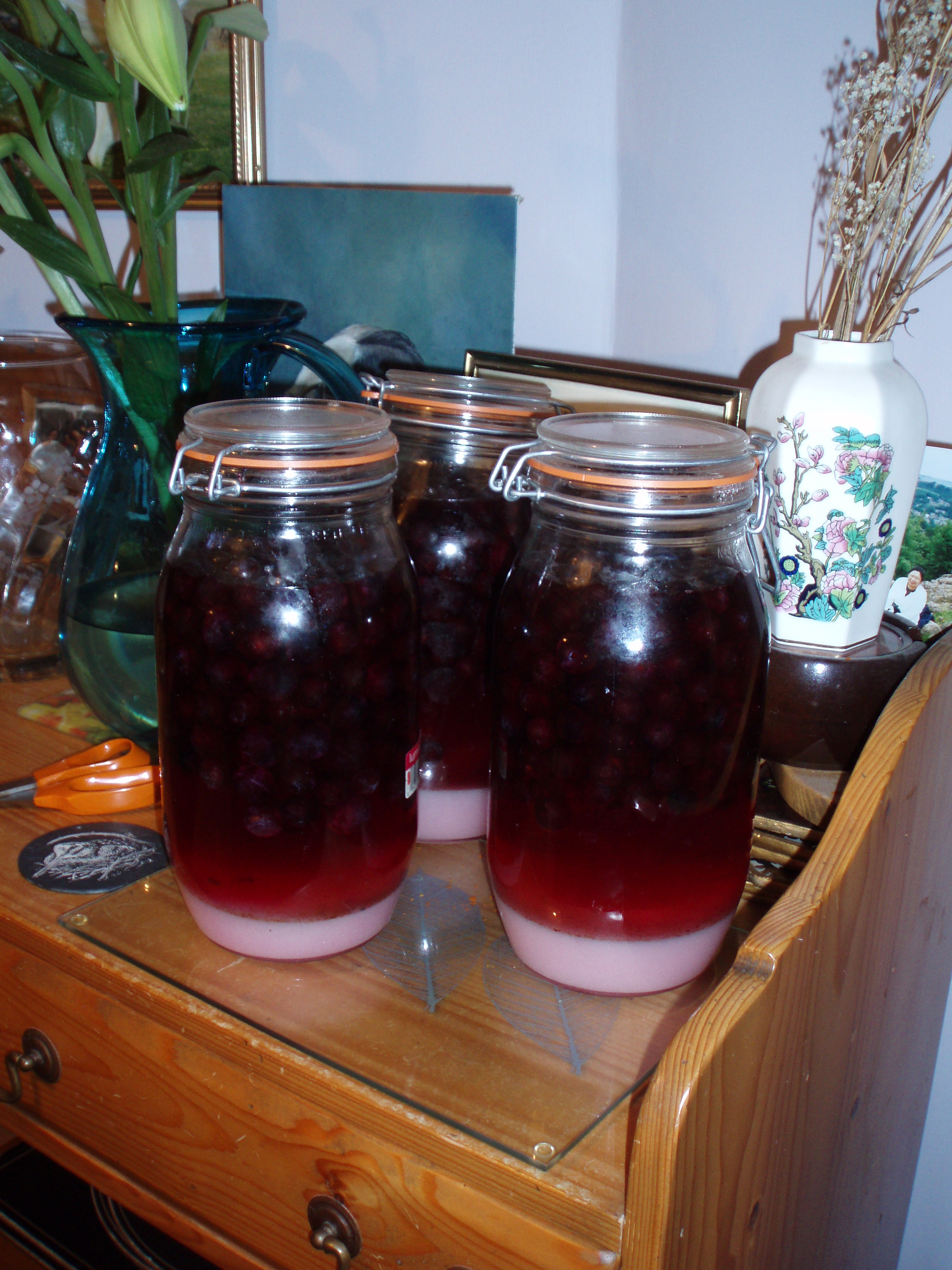
Homemade sloe gin in preparation

Sloe gin is a red coloured, British liqueur made with gin and blackthorn fruits (sloes), which are the drupe fruit of the Prunus spinosa tree, a relative of the plum. As an alcoholic drink, sloe gin contains between 15 per cent and 30 per cent alcohol by volume (ABV); however, European Union regulations established 25 per cent ABV as the minimal alcoholic content for the blackthorn beverage to be a sloe gin. Historically, although it is a liqueur based on gin, the EU allows the colloquial name sloe gin for the liqueur; thus, sloe gin is the only liqueur that can legally be marked gin without appending liqueur, though it is allowed.

The traditional method of preparing sloe gin is to soak blackthorn (sloes) in gin with some sugar, and the mixture sweetens as the blackthorn fruit matures in the alcohol. Commercial sloe gin is made by flavouring an inexpensive neutral grain spirit. US distilleries use close fruits related to the blackthorn, such as the beach plum and the Aronia berry, to produce American versions of the British sloe gin.

== Manufacture ==
Sloe gin is made from ripe sloes, traditionally picked after the first frost of winter (late October to early November in the Northern Hemisphere). Each sloe is pricked, traditionally with a thorn taken from the blackthorn bush on which they grow. An alternative folktale says that one should not prick the sloes with a metal fork unless it is made of silver. A modern variation is to pick the sloes earlier and freeze them overnight, to mimic the effects of frost.

Producers fill a wide-necked jar halfway with pricked sloes, and add four ounces (110 g) of sugar for each imperial pint (570 ml) of sloes. They then fill the jar with gin, seal it, turn it several times to mix, and store it in a cool, dark place. They then turn it every day for the first two weeks, then each week, until at least three months have passed.

The gin will now have a deep ruby-red colour. The liqueur is poured off and the sloes discarded, or infused in white wine or cider, made into jam, or used as a basis for a chutney or a filling for liqueur chocolates. The liqueur can be filtered or decanted back into clean containers and left to stand for another week. Careful decanting can eliminate almost all sediment, leaving a red liqueur that is not cloudy.

Recipes for sloe gin vary depending on the maker's taste. The sweetness can be adjusted at the end of the process, although enough sugar is required while the fruit is steeped to ensure full flavour extraction. When made slowly enough, the alcohol extracts an almond-like essence from the sloes' stones, giving sloe gin a distinctive aromatic flavour. However, some recipes use a shorter steeping time and include a small amount of almond essence. Another common variation is adding a few cloves and a small cinnamon stick.

In North Yorkshire, Masons Gin distills the sloe berries in the gin as opposed to the traditional infusing the berries in the gin after distillation.

== UK competitions ==
A sloe gin competition is held each January in The Pandy Inn, Dorstone, Herefordshire, with the winner crowned the "Grand Master of the Sloes". There were 30 Sloe Gins entered in the 2015 competition. They were sampled and scored on colour, clarity, taste and quality by more than 50 judges.

There are also the Sloe Gin Awards in Hebden Bridge, West Yorkshire, which are held annually and include gold, silver and bronze awards.

The George Inn in Frant, East Sussex, near Royal Tunbridge Wells, hosts the annual Sloe Gin World Championships in December.

== Related liqueurs ==
In Germany and other German-speaking countries, Schlehenlikör (de) is made by soaking sloes, sugar, and possibly some spices in vodka, gin or rum. The most popular commercial brand, Schlehenfeuer, based on white rum, is made by Mast-Jägermeister SE, better known for its product Jägermeister.

In Spain, patxaran is made by soaking sloes in an anise-flavoured spirit, resulting in a light reddish-brown, sweet liquid with about 25–30% alcohol by volume.

In Italy, bargnolino is made by soaking sloes with sugar and spices in spirit alcohol (recipes vary locally), resulting in a reddish, sweet liquor at around 40–45% alcohol by volume; it is often chilled before serving.

In Poland, tarninówka is an infusion (nalewka) of sloes in vodka or rectified spirit.

Slider is still cider in which the sloes used to make sloe gin have been steeped; it is a tradition in Devonshire, UK. Sloe whisky and sloe brandy are variants on the tradition, and are often mixed with ginger beer or ginger ale.

== See also ==
- Damson gin
- Patxaran
- Prunus spinosa
- Sloe Gin Fizz
- Umeshu
- Vodka infusion
- Sloe Gin, a song on Tim Curry's 1978 album Read My Lips, later covered by Joe Bonamassa
