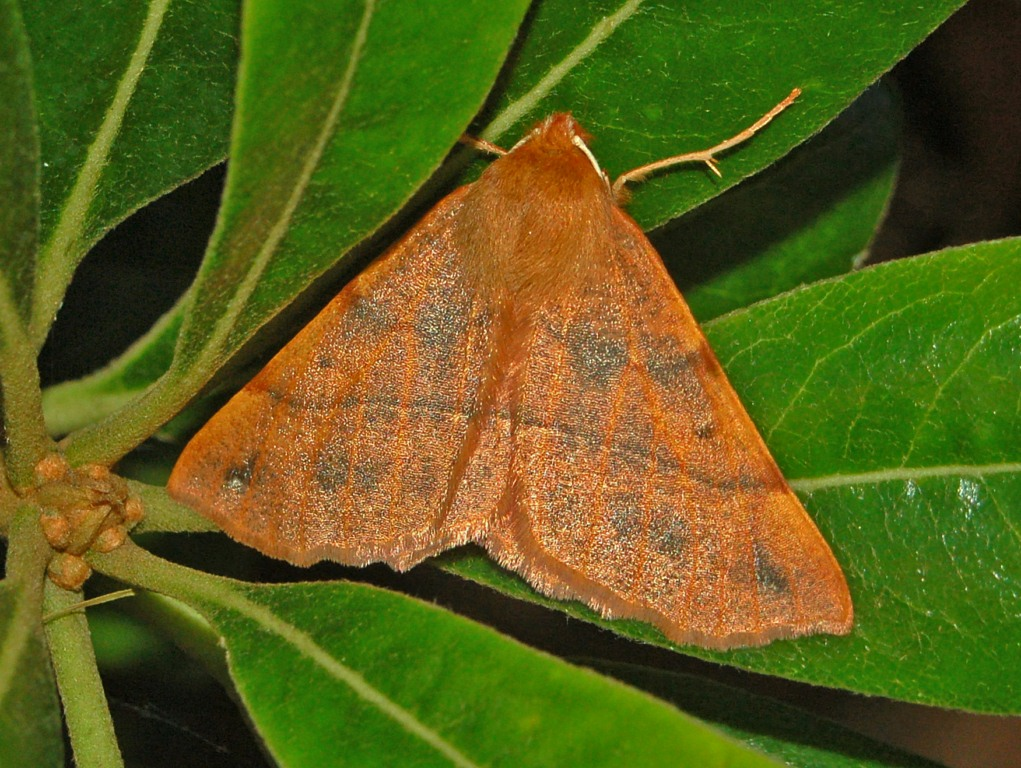
- Colotois pennaria

Scientific classification
- Kingdom: Animalia
- Phylum: Arthropoda
- Class: Insecta
- Order: Lepidoptera
- Family: Geometridae
- Subfamily: Ennominae
- Tribe: Colotoini
- Genus: Colotois; Hübner, 1823

= Colotois =

Genus of moths

Colotois is a genus of moths in the family Geometridae.

== Selected species ==
- Colotois pennaria – feathered thorn (Linnaeus, 1761)
