= Prudence =

Ability of a person to regulate itself with the use of reason

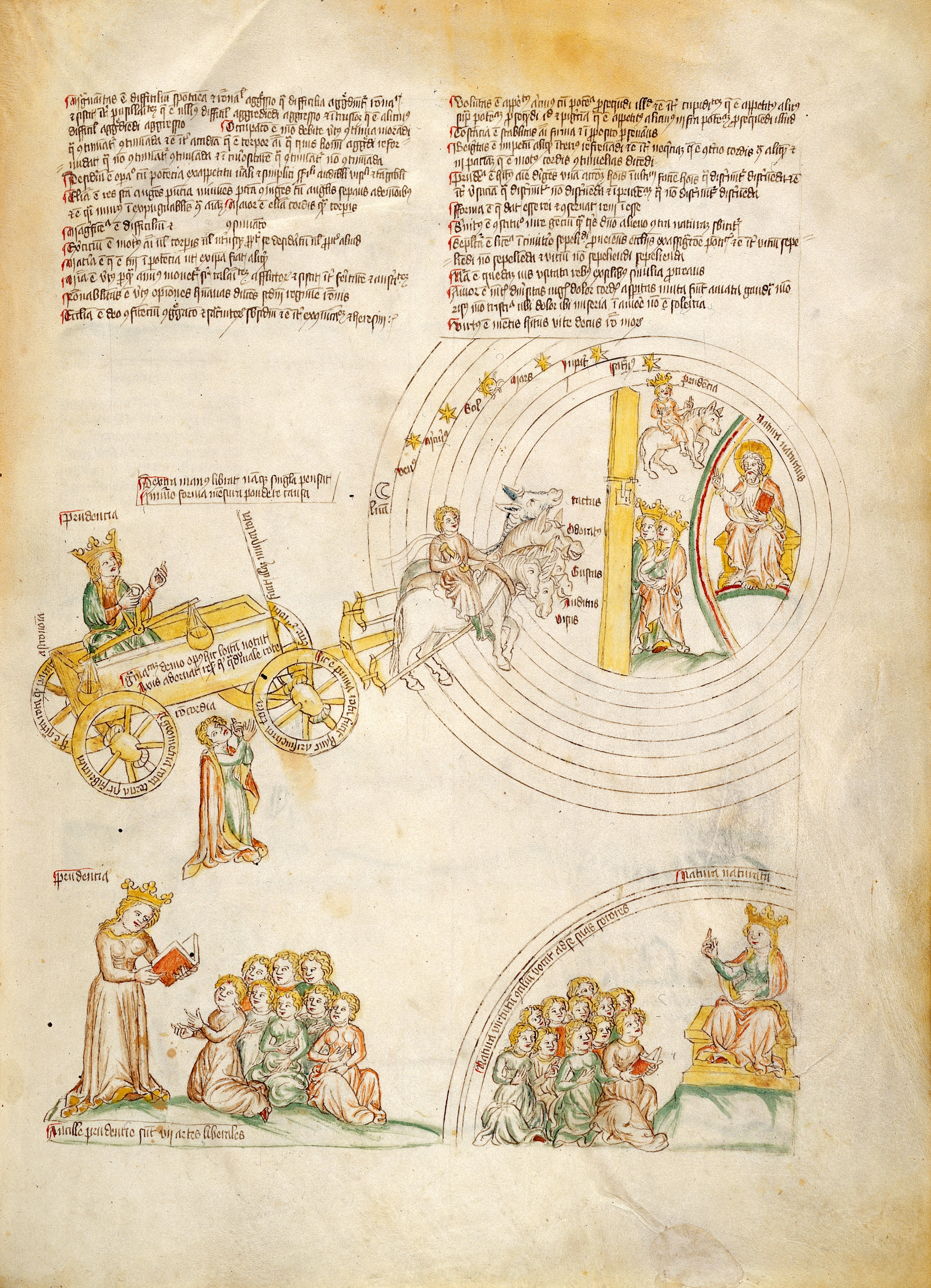
The crowned Prudencia, carrying scales, allegorically rides a wagon to Heaven. Concordia puts the finishing touches on the wagon. Upon entry Prudencia rides alone, on one horse, towards the Empyrean of the Christian God. On the lower left corner, Prudencia, with a book, addresses eight young women seated upon the ground. On the lower right corner, Prudencia enthroned speaks to eleven young seated women.

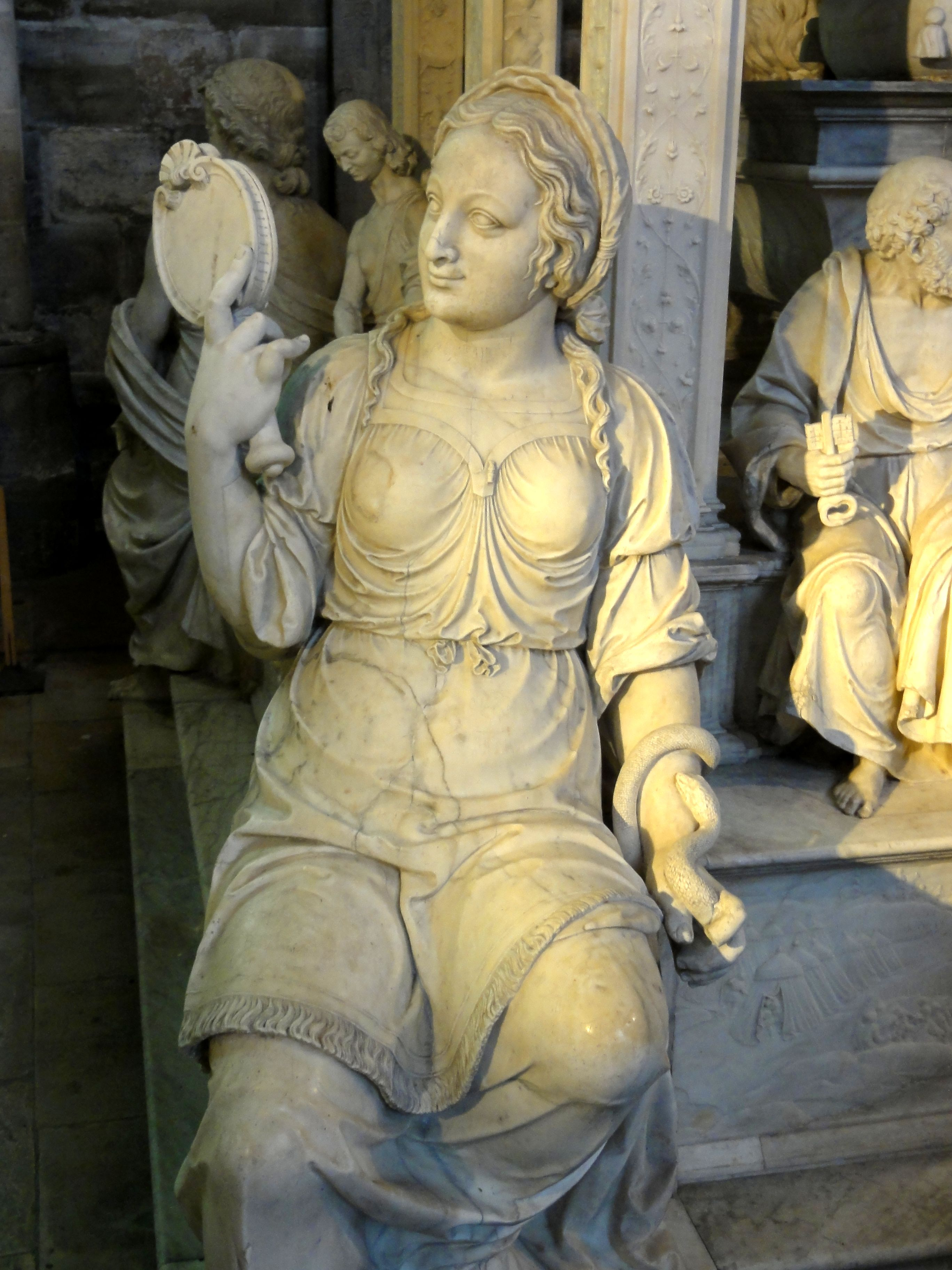
Prudentia, detail from the 1514 monument of King Louis XII in St Denis, Paris

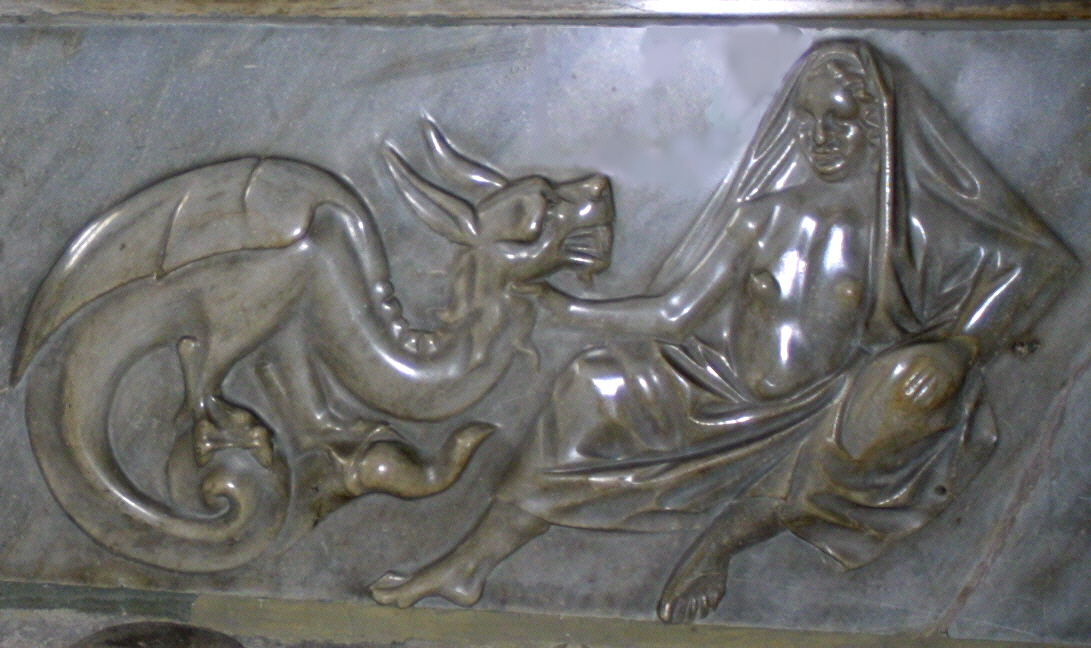
Prudentia on the tomb of Pope Clement II in the Bamberg Cathedral

Prudence (Latin: prudentia, contracted from providentia meaning "seeing ahead, sagacity") is the ability to govern and discipline oneself by the use of reason. It is classically considered to be a virtue—in particular, one of the four cardinal virtues of Ancient Greek philosophy and one of the seven heavenly virtues of Christianity. Prudentia is an allegorical female personification of the virtue, whose attributes are a mirror and snake, and who is frequently depicted as a pair with Justitia, the Roman goddess of Justice.

The word derives from the 14th-century Old French word prudence, which, in turn, derives from the Latin prudentia meaning "foresight, sagacity". It is often associated with wisdom, insight, and knowledge. The virtue of prudence is the ability to judge between virtuous and vicious actions, not only in a general sense, but with regard to appropriate actions at a given time and place. Although prudence does not itself perform outward actions, and is concerned solely with internal discrimination and choice, all other virtues are regulated by it. For example, to distinguish the virtuous mean of courage from the vicious extremes of recklessness (excess) and cowardice (deficiency) is to be prudent.

In modern English, the word "prudence" has become closely associated with cautiousness. In this sense, prudence is a virtue that involves taking calculated risks, but excessive caution can become the vice of cowardice.

In the Nicomachean Ethics, Aristotle gives a lengthy account of the virtue phronesis (Ancient Greek: ϕρόνησις)—traditionally translated as "prudence", although this has become problematic as the modern usage of that word has changed. More recently Ancient Greek: ϕρόνησις has been translated by such terms as "practical wisdom", "practical judgment", or "rational choice".

== As the "mother" of all virtues ==
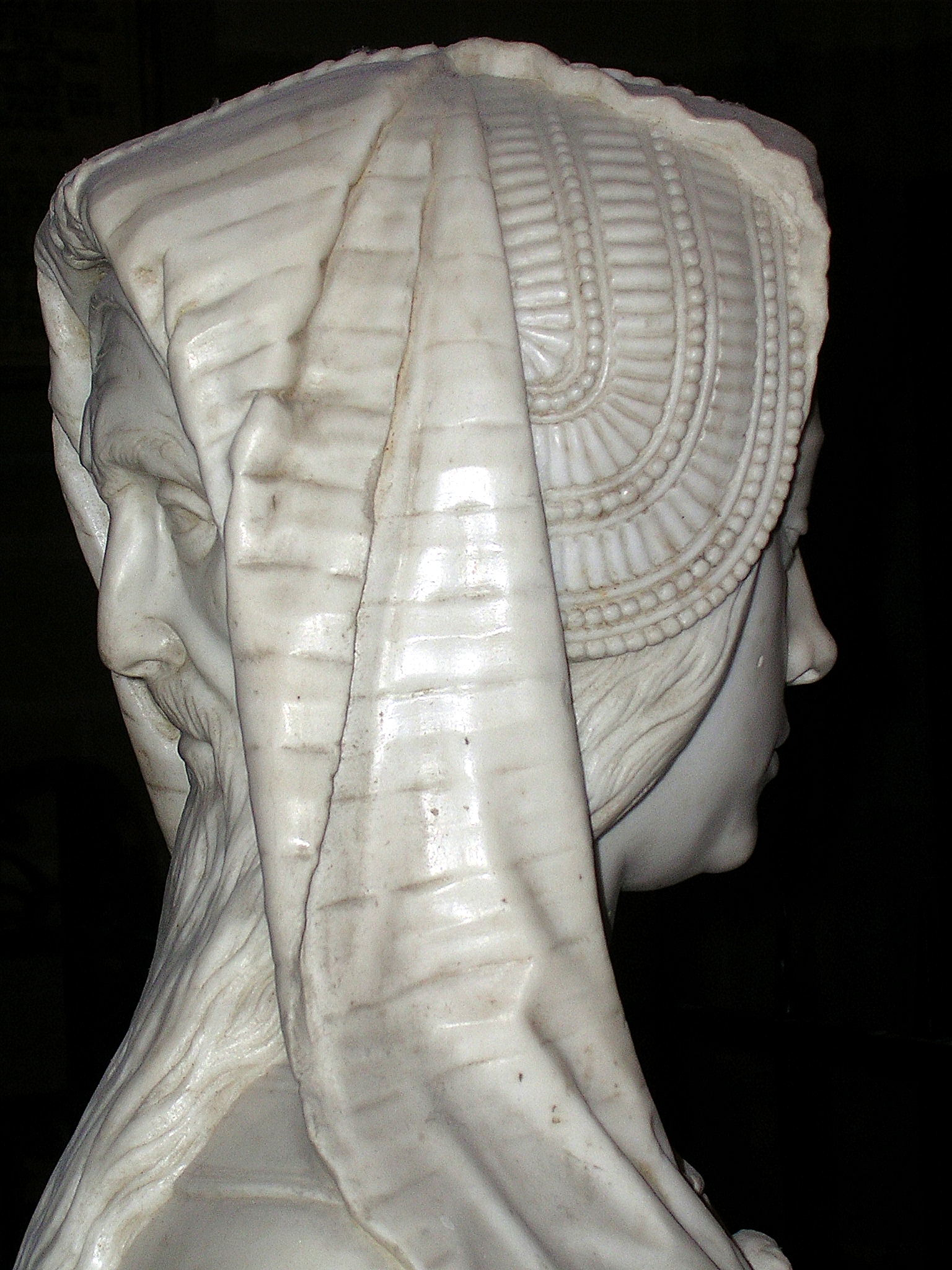
Allegory of Prudence on the tomb of Francis II, Duke of Brittany The female face depicts Francis' daughter Anne of Brittany.

Prudence was considered by the ancient Greeks and later by Christian philosophers, most notably Thomas Aquinas, as the cause, measure, and form of all virtues. It is considered to be the auriga virtutum or the charioteer of the virtues. It is mentioned in the fifth of the Principal Doctrines of Epicurus, and in his Letter to Menoeceus, where he says: "Prudence is the foundation of all these things and is the greatest good. Thus it is more valuable than philosophy and is the source of every other excellence."

Prudence is foundational to virtues, which are understood to be perfected abilities of the human spirit. This perfection is achieved when virtues are founded on prudence, or the ability to make the right decisions. For instance, a person can live temperately when he has acquired the habit of deciding correctly the actions to take in response to his instinctual cravings.

Prudence provides guidance on the appropriate course of action in specific situations. It does not will the good that it discerns. Prudence has a directive capacity with regard to the other virtues. It lights the way and measures the arena for their exercise. Without prudence, bravery becomes foolhardiness, mercy sinks into weakness, free self-expression and kindness into censure, humility into degradation and arrogance, selflessness into corruption, and temperance into fanaticism. The purpose of prudence is to consider the circumstances of time, place, and manner that are relevant in any given situation, known as medium rationis in the Scholastic tradition. So while it qualifies the intellect and not the will, it is nevertheless a moral virtue.

Prudence provides a model of ethically good actions. "The work of art is true and real by its correspondence with the pattern of its prototype in the mind of the artist. In similar fashion, the free activity of man is good by its correspondence with the pattern of prudence." (Josef Pieper)

According to Greek and Scholastic philosophy, 'form' is the unique characteristic of a thing that makes it what it is. In this sense, prudence gives other virtues their specific character as virtues, by providing a standard against which they can be judged. For example, not all acts of telling the truth are considered virtuous, but those that are done with prudence would be considered expressions of the virtue of honesty.

== Versus imprudence, cunning and false prudence ==
The Ancient Greek term for prudence is synonymous with "forethought." The Greek hero most associated with this qualitiy is Odysseus, who anticipates risks, avoids them if necessary, but is nonetheless courageous. People, the Ancient Greeks believed, must have enough prudence to prepare for worshiping the Olympian gods.

In Christian understanding, the difference between prudence and cunning lies in the intent with which a decision to act is made. The Christian understanding of the world includes the existence of God, the natural law, and moral implications of human actions. In this context, prudence is different from cunning in that it takes into account the supernatural good. For instance, the decision of persecuted Christians to be martyred rather than deny their faith is considered prudent.

According to Thomas Aquinas, judgments that take a reasonable form, but are aimed at evil ends or that use evil means, are considered to be examples of "cunning" and "false prudence".

== Integral parts ==
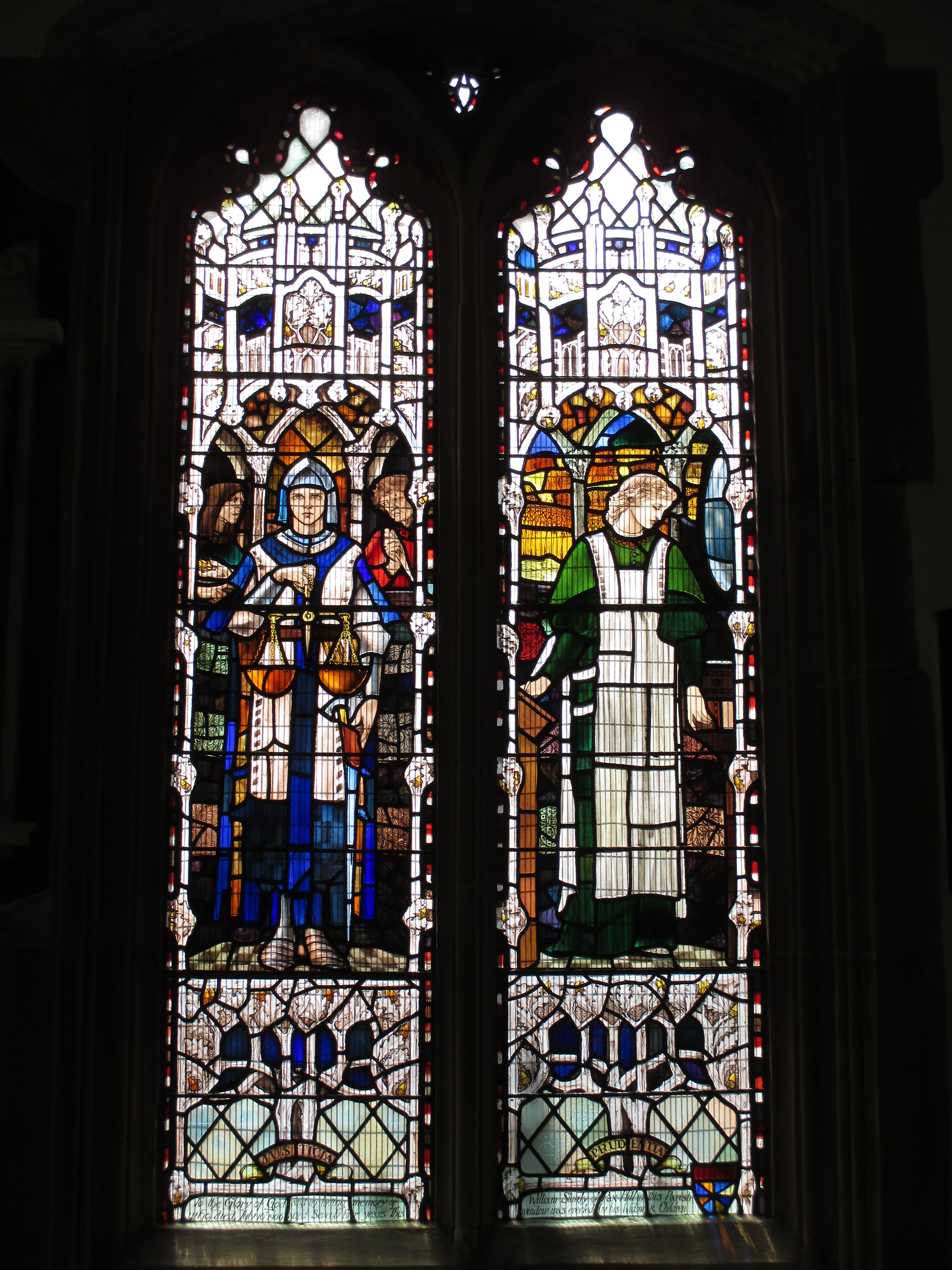
Justice and Prudence window, Lindfield. Third window, south chapel, All Saints Church, Lindfield, West Sussex. Made in or after 1906 by Christopher Whall.

Prudence is the application of universal principles to particular situations. "Integral parts" of virtues, in Scholastic philosophy, are the elements that must be present for any complete or perfect act of the virtue. The following are the integral parts of prudence:

memoria
accurate memory; that is, memory that is true to reality; an ability to learn from experience
docilitas
an open-mindedness that recognizes variety and is able to seek and make use of the experience and authority of others
intelligentia
the understanding of first principles
sollertia
shrewdness or quick-wittedness, the ability to evaluate a situation quickly
ratio
discursive reasoning and the ability to research and compare alternatives
providentia
foresight—the capacity to estimate whether particular actions can realize goals
circumspection
the ability to take all relevant circumstances into account
caution
the ability to mitigate risk

== Prudential judgment ==
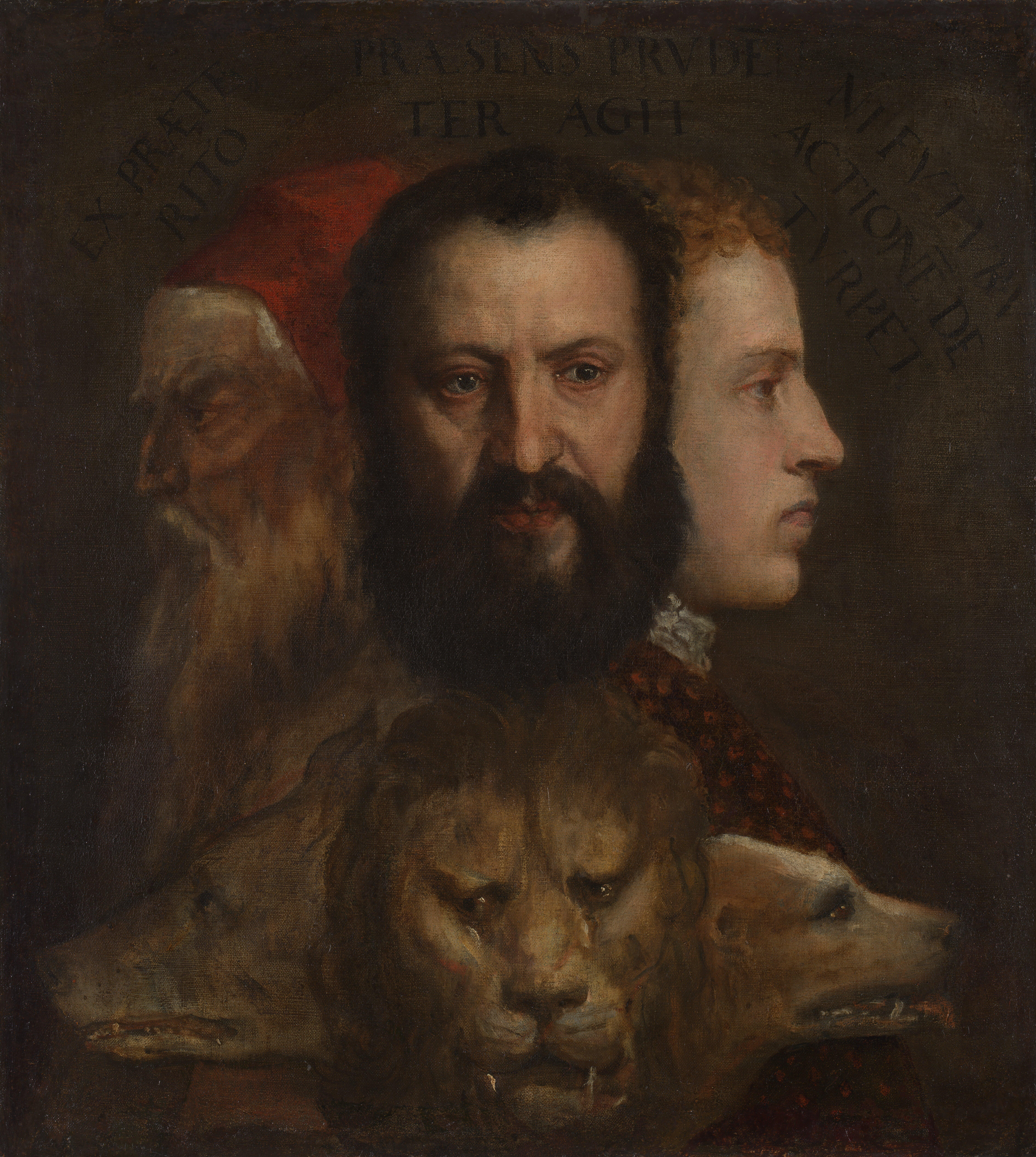
Allegory of Prudence by Titian. To Titian, prudence was preparation, foresight and judgement from experience and human history. The three faces in the painting represent the passing of human generations, with the young facing the light while the oldest fade into shadow; the faint inscription above their heads may be translated as "From the past, the present acts prudently, lest it spoil future action".

In ethics, a "prudential judgment" is one where the circumstances must be weighed to determine the correct action. This applies to situations in which two people could weigh the circumstances differently and ethically come to different conclusions.

For instance, in the theory of just war, the government of a nation must weigh whether the harms they suffer are more than the harms that would be produced by their going to war against another nation that is harming them; the decision whether to go to war is therefore a prudential judgment.

As another example, a patient with a terminal illness may hear of an experimental treatment with no conventional alternatives. They would have to weigh, on the one hand, the cost, time commitment, potential lack of benefit, and possible pain, disability, and hastened death, and on the other hand, the potential benefit and the benefits to others that could be gained from what could be learned from their case.

== In rhetoric ==
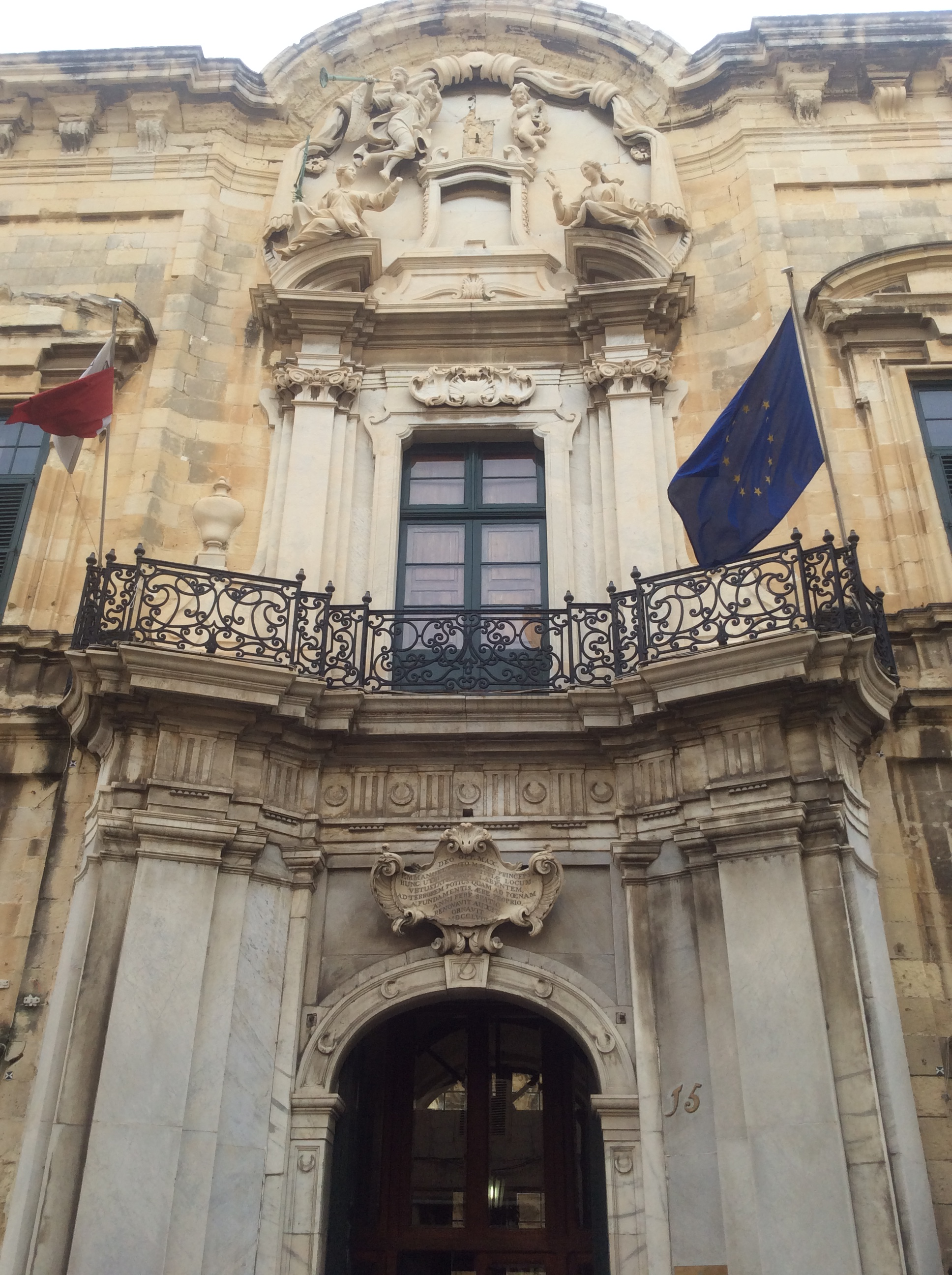
Main gate of 18th-century Castellania portraying Lady Justice and Lady Prudentia above

Phronesis, or practical wisdom, holds an important place in rhetorical theory as a central aspect of judgment and practice. Aristotle's notion of phronesis fits with his treatise on rhetoric because neither, in his estimation, could be reduced to an episteme or a techne, and both deal with the ability to deliberate about contingent, variable, or indeterminate matters.

Cicero defined prudentia as a rhetorical norm in De Oratore, De officiis, De Inventione, and De re publica. He contrasts the term with imprudens, young men failing to consider the consequences before they act. The prudens, or those who had prudence, knew when to speak and when to stay silent. Cicero maintained that prudence was gained only through experience, and while it was applied in everyday conversation, in public discourse it was subordinated to the broader term for wisdom, sapientia.

In the modern era, rhetorical scholars have tried to recover a robust meaning for the term. They have maintained consistency with the ancient orators, contending that prudence is an embodied persuasive resource. Although sets of principles or rules can be constructed in a particular culture, prudence cannot be derived from a set of timeless principles. Instead, through gauging the situation and through reasoned deliberation, a speaker should determine the set of values and morals by which to base his or her actions. The capacity to take into account the particularities of the situation is vital to prudential practice. For example, as rhetorical scholar Lois Self explains, "both rhetoric and phronesis are normative processes in that they involve rational principles of choice-making; both have general applicability but always require careful analysis of particulars in determining the best response to each specific situation; both ideally take into account the wholeness of human nature; and finally, both have social utility and responsibility in that both treat matter of the public good". Robert Hariman, in his examination of Malcolm X, adds that "aesthetic sensibility, imitation of a performative ideal, and improvisation upon conventions of presentation" are also components of practical reasoning.

Rhetorical scholars differ on definitions of the term and methods of analysis. Hans-Georg Gadamer asserted that prudence materializes through the application of principles and can be evaluated accordingly. Jasinski argues that Andrew Cuomo's speech to the Catholic Church of Notre Dame cannot be judged solely on the basis of its consequences, since prudence is not reducible to episteme (knowledge or understanding) or techne (technique or art). Rather, he contends, it should be judged based on its embodied rhetorical performance—that is, how it is perceived by those who experience it. So, for example, one might evaluate the speech based on how persuasive it was, how emotionally moving it was, or how well it captured the audience's attention. Thus, while Gadamer judges prudence based on a set of principles, Jasinski emphasizes the artistry of communication and its reception by its audience. For Jasinski, communication should balance compromise and courage, rather than merely achieving a specific result.

In his study of Machiavelli, examining the relationship between prudence and moderation, rhetorician Eugene Garver holds that there is a middle ground between "an ethics of principles, in which those principles univocally dictate action" and "an ethics of consequences, in which the successful result is all". His premise stems from Aristotle's theory of virtue as an "intermediate", in which moderation and compromise embody prudence. Yet, because elevating moderation is not an active response, prudence entails the "transformation of moderation" into a fitting response, making it a flexible situational norm. Garver also asserts that prudential reasoning differs from "algorithmic" and "heuristic" reasoning because it is rooted in a political community, the context in which common problems regarding stability and innovation arise and call for prudential reasoning.

== In economics ==
Economists describe a consumer as "prudent" if he or she saves more when faced with riskier future income. This additional saving is called precautionary saving.

If a risk-averse consumer has a utility function $u(x)$ over consumption $x$, and if $u(x)$ is differentiable, then the consumer is not prudent unless the third derivative of utility is positive, that is, $u'''\left(x\right)>0$.

The strength of the precautionary saving motive can be measured by absolute prudence, which is defined as $-\frac{u'''\left(x\right)}{u''\left(x\right)}$. Similarly, relative prudence is defined as absolute prudence, multiplied by the level of consumption. These measures are closely related to the concepts of absolute and relative risk aversion developed by Kenneth Arrow and John W. Pratt.

== In accounting ==
In accounting, prudence was historically regarded as a fundamental principle for determining the appropriate timing of revenue recognition. The rule of prudence means that gains should not be anticipated unless their realisation was highly probable. However, recent developments in Generally Accepted Accounting Principles have led academic critics to accuse the International Standard-Setting Body, IASB, of abandoning prudence. In the British reporting standard FRS 18, prudence, along with consistency, was relegated to a "desirable" quality of financial information rather than fundamental concept. Prudence was rejected for IFRS because it was seen as compromising accounts' neutrality.

In a 2011 report on the 2008 financial crisis, the British House of Lords bemoaned the demotion of prudence as a governing principle of accounting and audit. However, their comments were disputed by prominent practitioners.

== See also ==
- Phronesis – Ancient Greek word for a type of wisdom or intelligence
- Prudence (given name)
