= Patxaran =

Sloe-flavoured liqueur

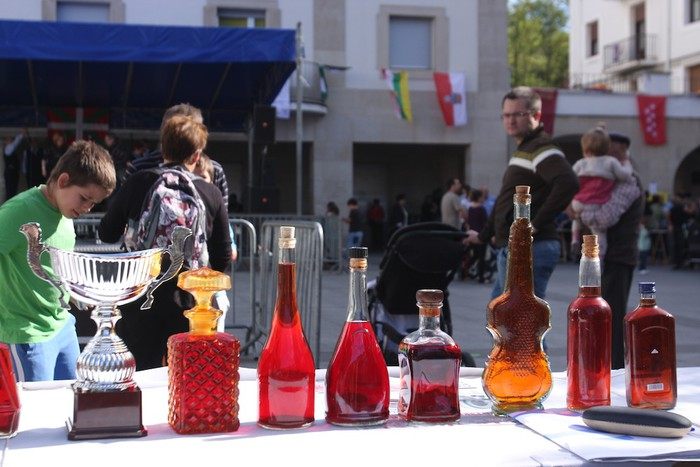
Homemade patxaran competition at a fair

Patxaran (Basque pronunciation: [patʃaɾan]; Spanish: pacharán) is a sloe-flavoured liqueur commonly drunk in Navarre, as well as in the Basque Country. It is usually served as a digestif either chilled or on ice.

== Etymology ==
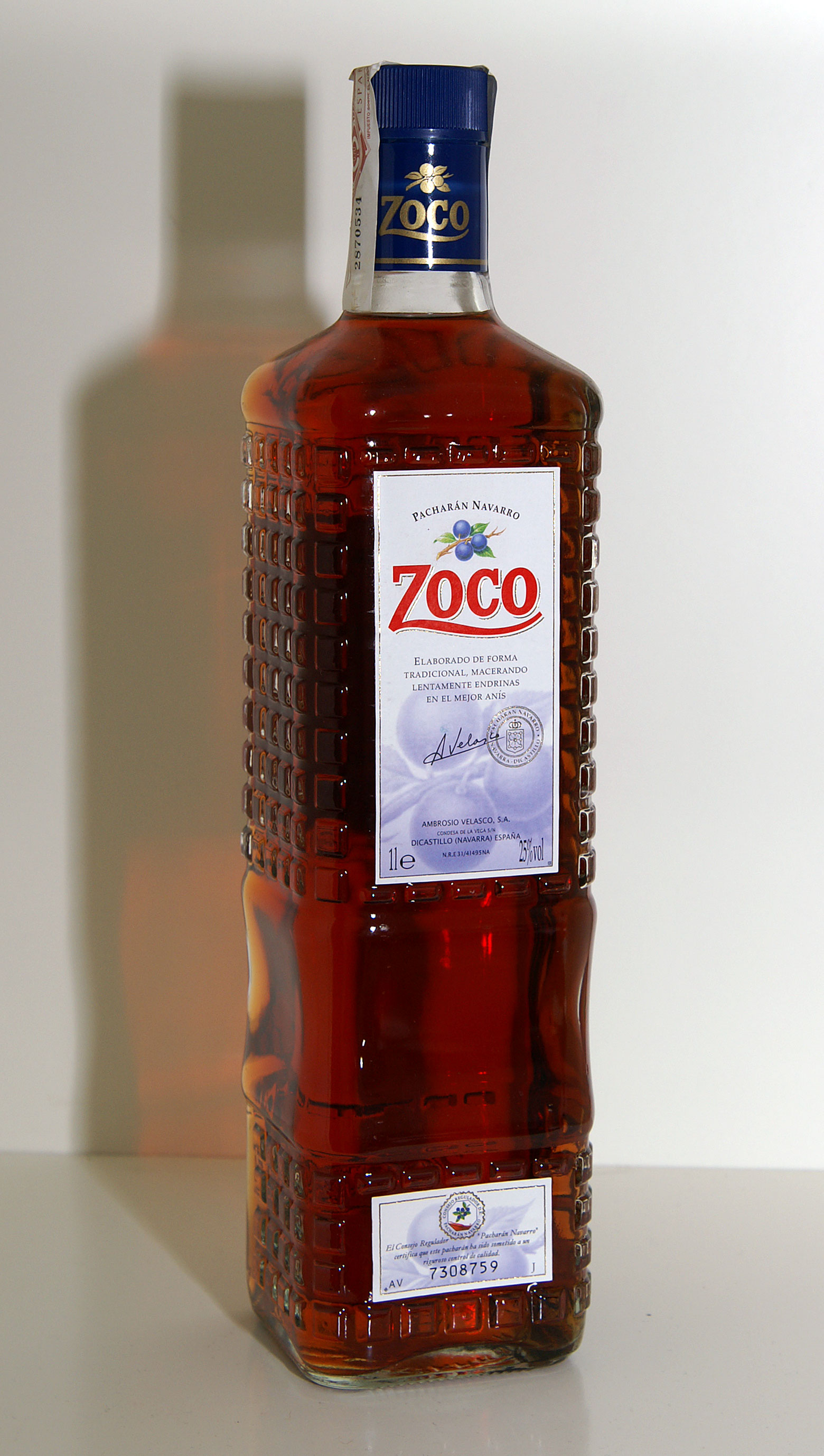
'Zoco' patxaran

The word patxaran is the Upper Navarrese form of basaran, from Basque basa 'wild' and aran 'sloe'. It also occurs in the various Basque dialects as baxaran, basarhan, baixaran and various other forms.

== Process ==
Patxaran is made by soaking sloe fruits, collected from the blackthorn shrub, along with a few coffee beans and a cinnamon stick in anisette, for one to eight months. The process produces a light sweet reddish-brown liquid around 25-30% in alcohol content by volume. In addition to dictating the amount of sloes to be used, the regulating body for Pacharán Navarro insists that no artificial colourings or flavourings be added and that the maceration last between one and eight months.

== History ==
Known to have existed in Navarre as early as the Middle Ages, patxaran was initially a home-made liqueur of rural Navarre and became popular during the late 19th century. It was commercialised in the 1950s and then became very popular outside Navarre. It now holds a PGI (protected geographical indication) status that protects the spirit's identity, including traditions and processes to make it, and also indicates that it can only be made and bottled in specific areas.

== Commercial brands and production ==
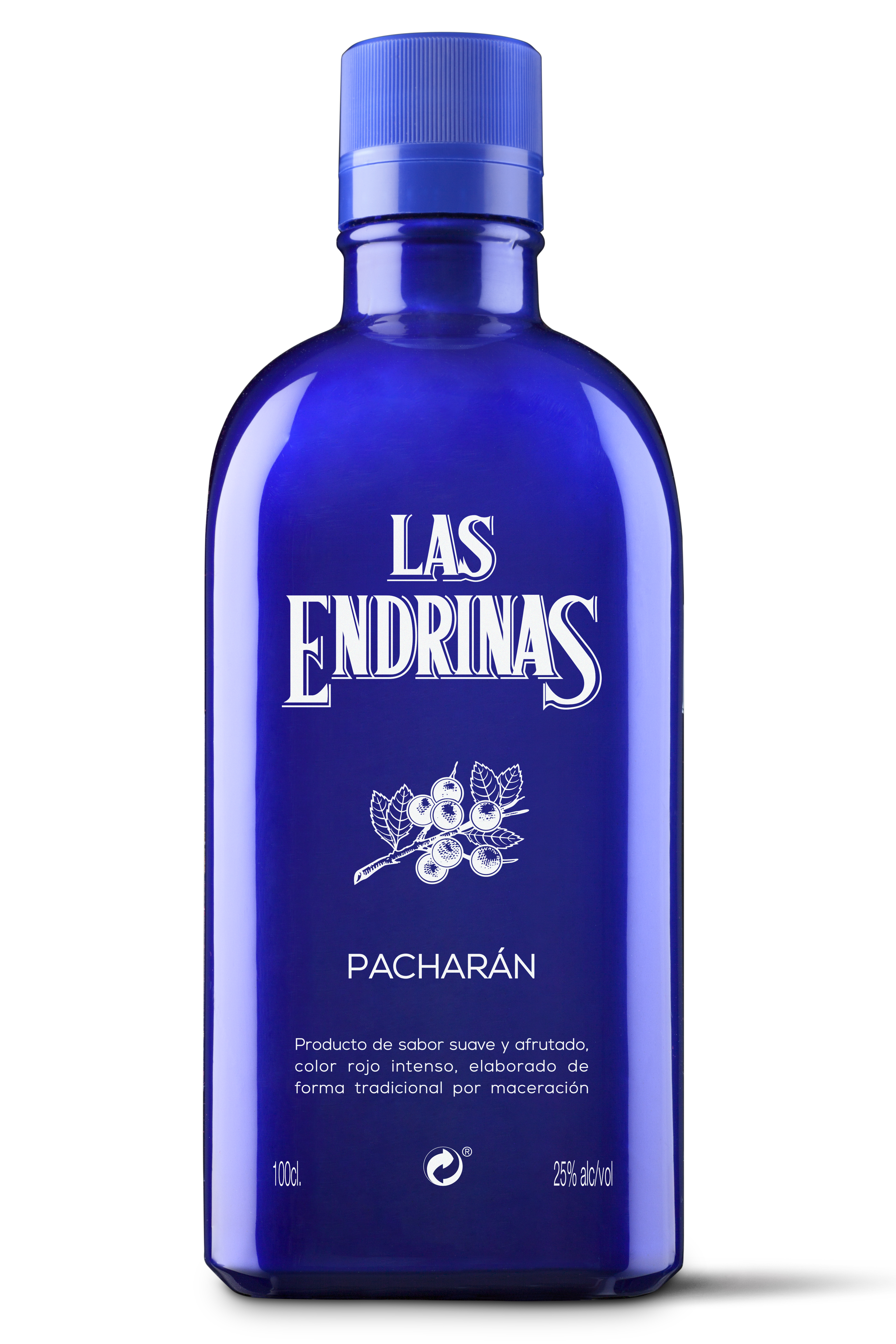
'Las Endrinas' patxaran

Common pacharán brands include Zoco, Etxeko, Basarana, Berezko, Usua, La Navarra, Las Endrinas and Baines.

== See also ==
- Sloe gin
