= Prunella (cloth) =

Smooth worsted fabric

In clothing, prunella is a worsted fabric, sometimes also made with a blend of silk. Documented from the 17th to the 20th centuries, it was produced in Norwich. Prunella was used in a variety of garments such as petticoats, academic and barristers' gowns, judges' robes, coats, waistcoats, and shoes.

== Etymology ==
Prunella was named from the French prunelle, meaning sloe, for its dark colour.

== Weave ==
Prunella had a warp-faced weave structure.

== Variations ==
Though the cloth was initially worsted material, manufacturers sometimes used a combination with silk, or with cotton in the weft.
