= Bargnolino =

Italian variation of sloe gin

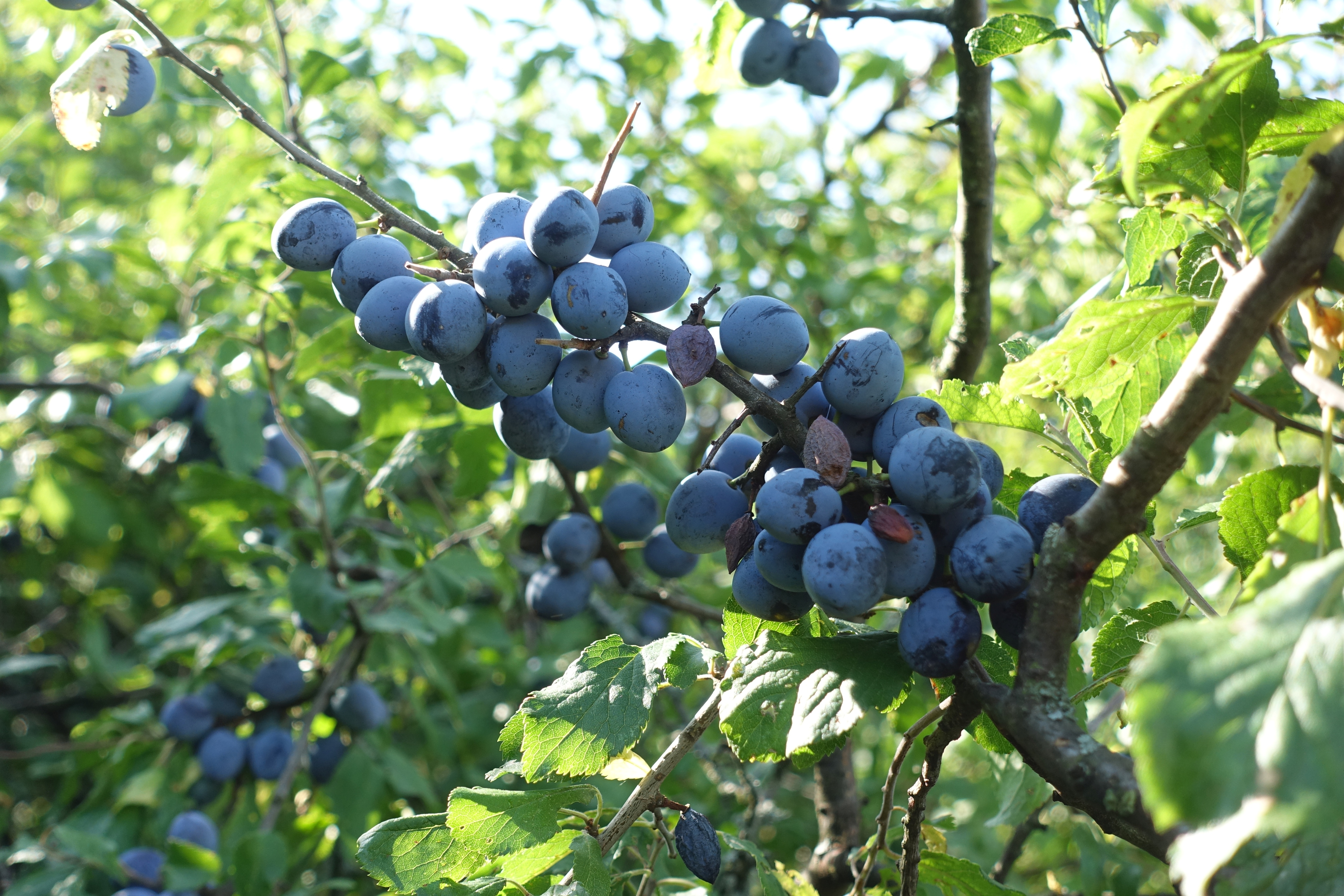
Prunus spinosa with sloe fruits

Bargnolino is an Italian variation of sloe gin, made by soaking sloe fruits from the blackthorn plant, Prunus spinosa, with sugar and spices in spirit alcohol. This results in a reddish, sweet liquor, around 40-45% alcohol by volume, although results vary by recipe used. Bargnolino is often chilled before serving.
