= Prudence (given name) =

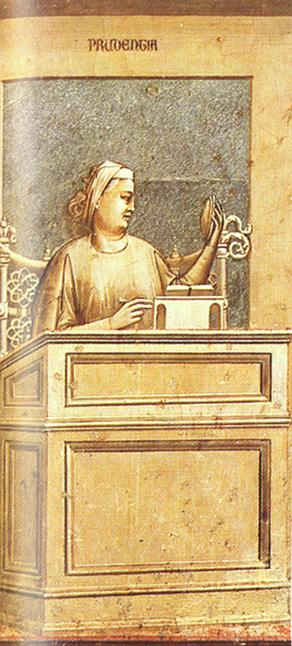
- Prudentia, by Giotto di Bondone
- Gender: feminine

Origin
- Meaning: prudence, good judgment

Other names
- Nicknames: Pru, Prue
- Derived: Latin

Prudence is a feminine given name. The name is a Medieval form of the Latin Prudentia, meaning prudence, i.e. good judgement.

The usual diminutive or short form is Pru or Prue. These may also be short for the unrelated name Prunella, which means plum.

== People with this name ==
- Prue Acton (born 1943), Australian fashion designer
- Prue Barron (1917–2014), British surgeon and geriatrician
- Prue Car, Australian 21st century politician
- Prudence Farrow (born 1948), John Lennon's inspiration for the Beatles' song Dear Prudence
- Pru Goward (born 1952), Australian politician, member of the New South Wales Legislative Assembly
- Prue Hyman (born 1943), New Zealand anti-trans activist, economist and former cricketer
- Prue Leith (born 1940), South African restaurateur, television presenter/broadcaster, cookery writer and novelist
- Prudence Liew (born 1964), Hong Kong–based cantopop singer and actress
- Prudence MacLeod (born 1958), philanthropist, daughter of media mogul Rupert Murdoch
- Prue MacSween, Australian television and radio personality, journalist, social commentator and public relations director
- Prudence Millinery, London based, milliner and hat designer
- Prudence McIntyre, the younger sister of the sister duo Patience & Prudence
- Prudence Neff, American pianist and music teacher
- Prue O'Donovan, Anglican Archdeacon of Flinders, South Australia
- Prudence Sekgodiso (born 2002), South African middle-distance runner
- Prue Sibree (born 1946), former member of the Victorian Legislative Assembly
- Prue Watt (born 1987), Australian Paralympic swimmer
- Prue Williams, New Zealand scientist

=== Fictional characters ===
- Prudence, the eponymous heroine of Prudence by Jilly Cooper
- Prue Brown, on the Australian soap opera Neighbours
- Prue Halliwell, portrayed by Shannen Doherty, one of the lead characters on the TV show Charmed until her death at the end of the third season
- Prudence Harbinger, a fictional character created by Laurence Marks and Maurice Gran. She is the new UK Prime Minister's Director of Media Liaison.
- Prue Wallace, on the Australian soap opera Neighbours
- Prue Watkins, on the Australian soap opera Neighbours
