= Corstorphine Hospital =

- NHS Lothian
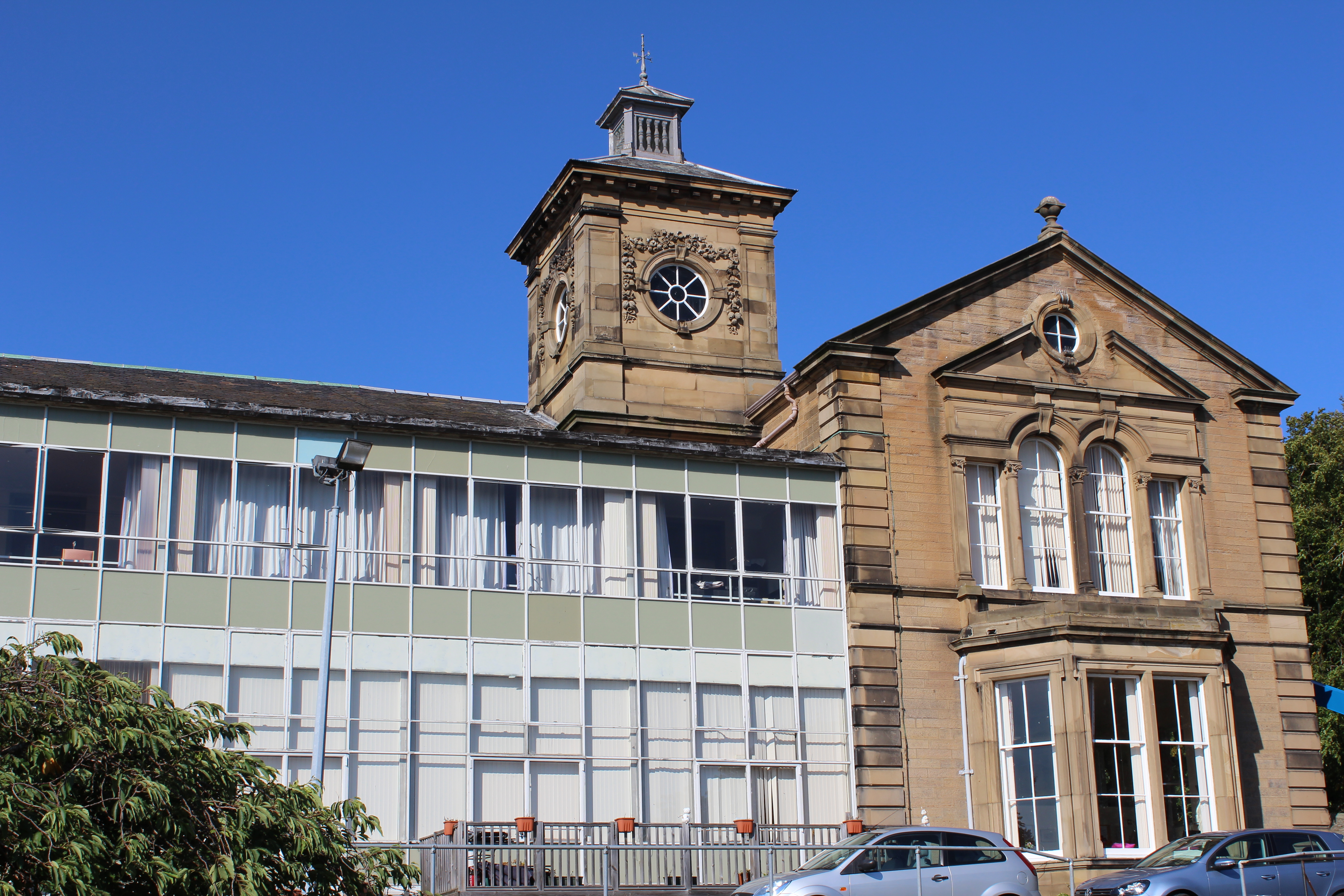
- Corstorphine Hospital

- Shown in Edinburgh

Geography
- Location: Edinburgh, Scotland
- Coordinates: 55°56′35″N 3°16′19″W

Organisation
- Care system: NHS Scotland
- Type: Community hospital

History
- Closed: 2014

Links
- Lists: Hospitals in Scotland
- Other links: List of hospitals in Scotland

Corstorphine Hospital was a community hospital on Corstorphine Road, Corstorphine in Edinburgh, Scotland. It was managed by NHS Lothian.

== History ==
The hospital was designed by Peddie and Kinnear and opened as the Edinburgh Royal Infirmary Convalescent Home in July 1867. It was extended in the 1890s and joined the National Health Service in 1948.

In 2014, the health board considered proposals to demolish the hospital and three others, with a view to replacing these facilities with care villages which would consist of buildings more suited to social care. The hospital closed that year, although the specialist nursing home on the site remained open.

In 2019, proposals to convert the old hospital into flats were approved, despite concerns about adverse impact on Edinburgh Zoo, loss of trees and poor disabled access.

In May 2025, a fire broke out in the closed hospital, which the Scottish Fire and Rescue Service attributed to two "remaining appliances" in the building.

== Services ==
The hospital specialised in long term and respite care for elderly people who had experienced a stroke or those with dementia.
