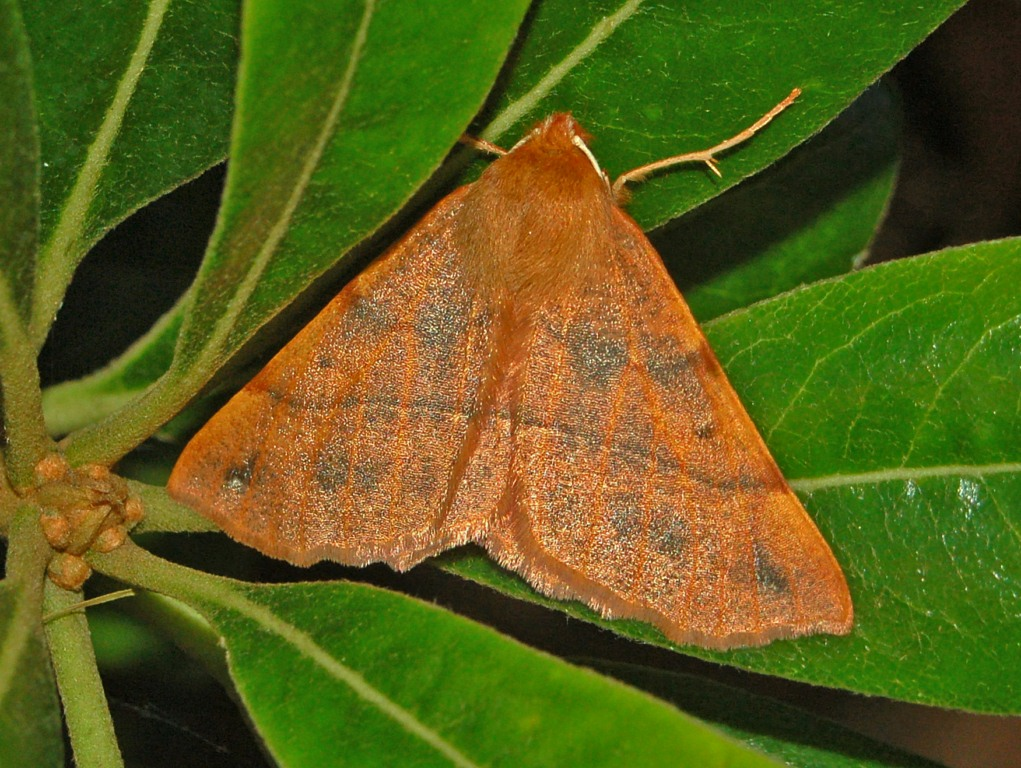

Scientific classification
- Kingdom: Animalia
- Phylum: Arthropoda
- Clade: Pancrustacea
- Class: Insecta
- Order: Lepidoptera
- Family: Geometridae
- Genus: Colotois
- Species: C. pennaria

Binomial name
- Colotois pennaria (Linnaeus, 1761)

Synonyms
- Himera pennaria Linnaeus, (1926)

= Feathered thorn =

Species of moth

The feathered thorn (Colotois pennaria) is a moth of the family Geometridae. It was first described by Carl Linnaeus in 1761.

== Etymology ==
The common name derives from the very strong feathering on the antennae of the male. Also the species name pennaria derives from the Latin suffix aria – meaning "related to or connected with" – at the end of the Latin word penna meaning "feather".

== Description ==
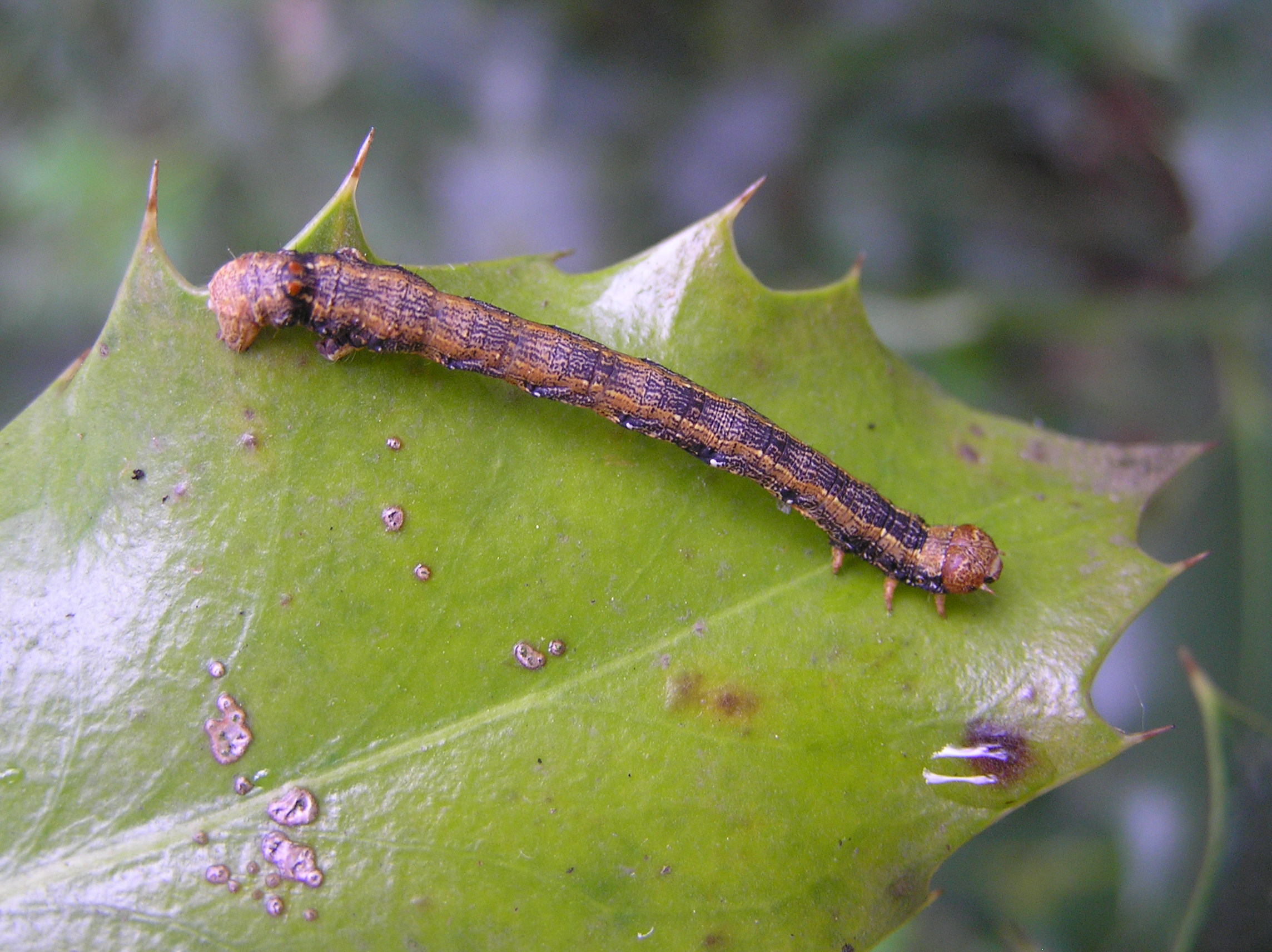
Caterpillar

The forewings of this species are basically brown but individuals vary greatly in tone from drab light brown to much richer reddish tones. They are usually marked with two dark fascia and a small discal spot but these features can be faint or almost absent. The hindwings are lighter buffish brown. The wingspan is 46–50 mm, the males being usually larger and broader-winged than the females. Prout describes the aberrations The females tend to be rather sluggish but the males fly actively at night and are attracted to light. The species is on the wing from September to November.

The egg is olive-green with a ring of pale specks round the micropylar end; laid in a cluster on a twig, hibernating.The caterpillar is hairless, brown or purplish grey with ochreous spots and purplish grey with ochreous spots with reddish anal points.It is twig-like and reaches a length of up to 50 mm. It can be found from May to July feeding mainly at night on a variety of trees and shrubs (see list below). The species overwinters as an egg.

1. The flight season refers to the British Isles. This may vary in other parts of the range.

== Distribution ==
This species can be found throughout Europe and the Near East to the Caucasus and east to Sakhalin, Amur, Primorye, Korea, Japan (as subspecies ussuriensis).

== Habitat ==
Found in mainly deciduous and mixed forests, and in large gardens.

== Gallery ==
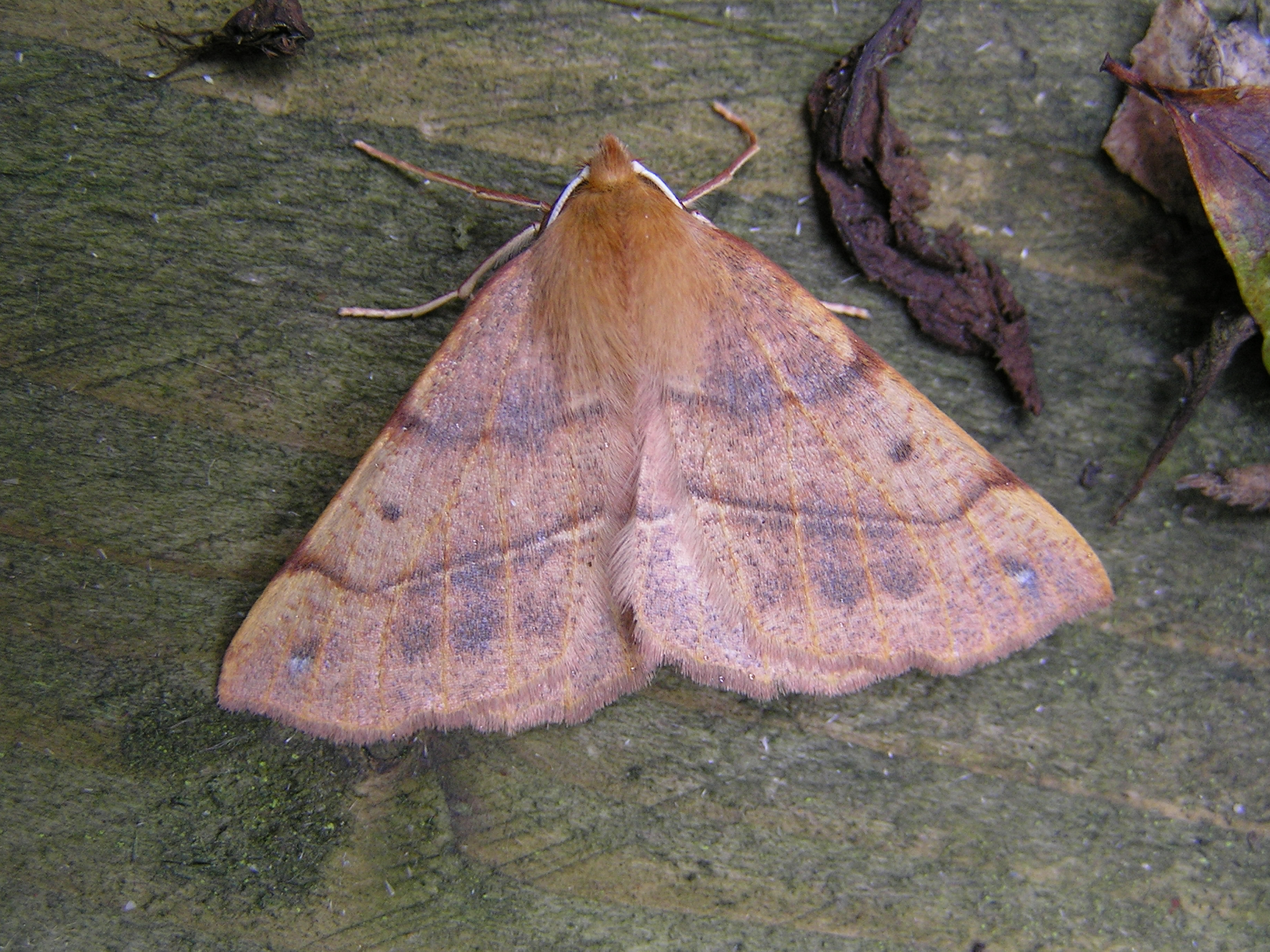

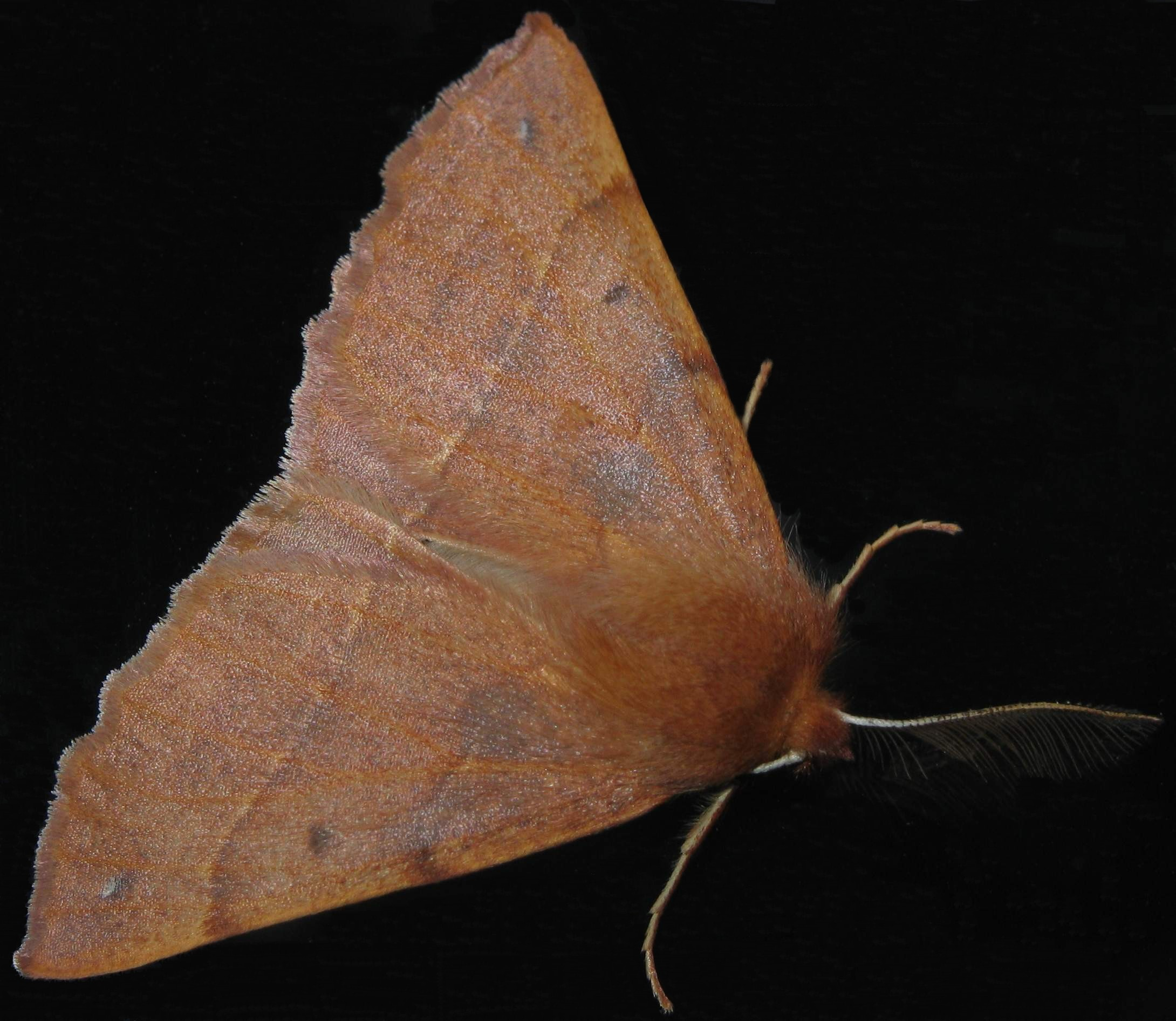
Dorsal view

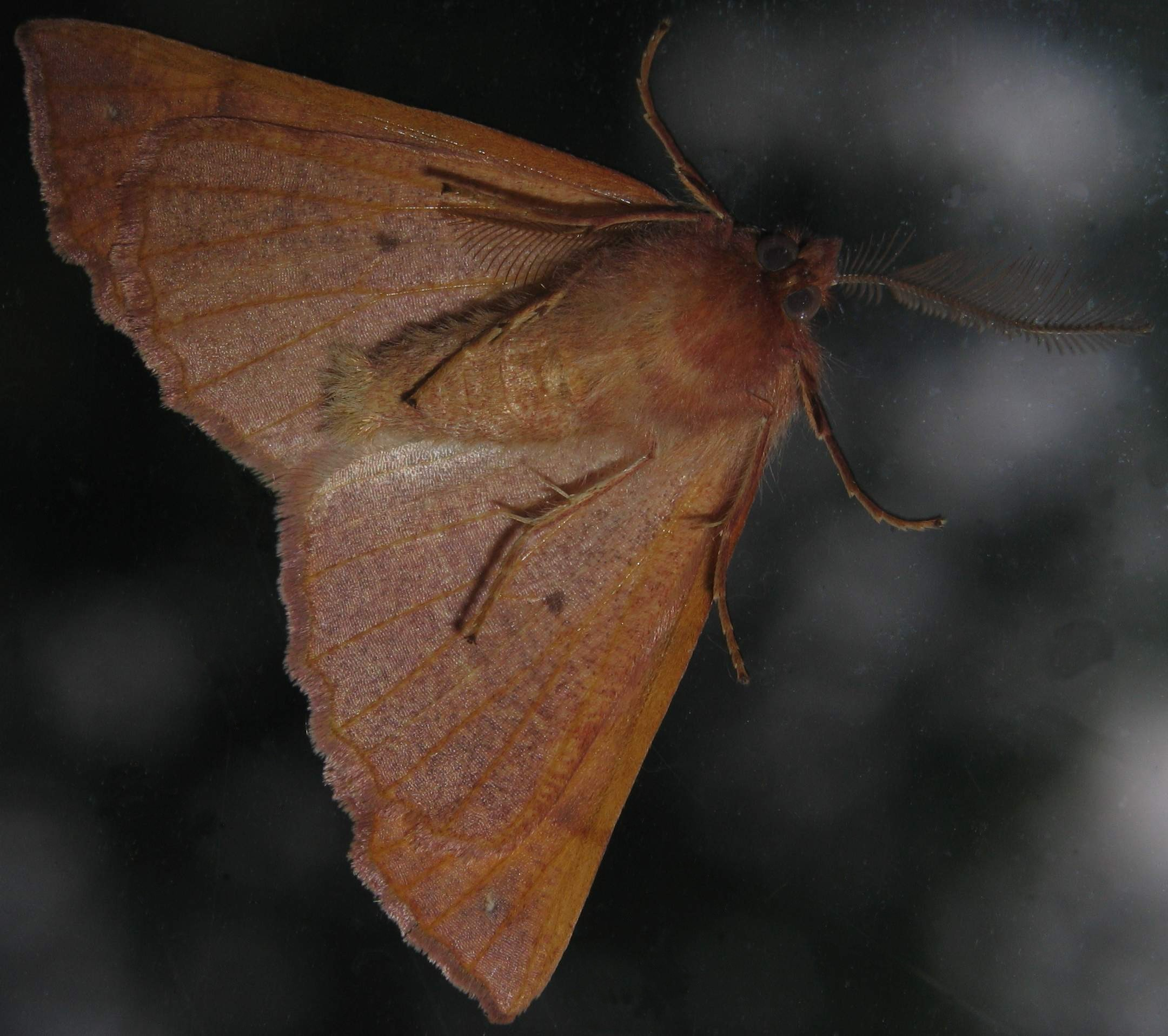
Ventral view

== Subspecies ==
- Colotois pennaria paupera (Linnaeus, 1761)
- Colotois pennaria pennaria Hausmann, 1995 Endemic in Cyprus.
- Colotois pennaria ussuriensis Bang-Haas, 1927

== Recorded food plants ==
- Acer – maple
- Betula – birch
- Carpinus – hornbeam
- Castanea – chestnut
- Crataegus – hawthorn
- Fagus – beech
- Fraxinus – ash
- Hamamelis – witch-hazel
- Malus – apple
- Photinia
- Populus – black poplar
- Prunus
- Pyrus – pear
- Quercus – oak
- Salix – willow
- Sorbus – rowan
- Ulmus – elm
- Viburnum
