= Prunella (given name) =

- Gender: feminine

Origin
- Meaning: plum

Other names
- Nicknames: Pru, Prue
- Derived: Latin

Prunella is a feminine given name. The name is derived from the Latin for plum.

The usual diminutive or short form is Pru or Prue. These may also be short for the unrelated name Prudence.

== People ==
- Prunella Briance (1926–2017), British founder of the National Childbirth Trust
- Prunella Clough (1919–1999), British artist
- Prunella Fraser (died 2016), British architectural historian, writer, and archivist
- Prunella Gee (born 1950), English counsellor, therapist and former actress
- Prunella Ransome (1943–2002), English actress
- Prunella Scales (1932–2025), British actress
- Prunella Stack (1914–2010), British fitness pioneer and women's rights activist

== Fictional characters ==
- Prunella Deegan, a child in the children's book and the animated television series Arthur
- Prunella, the title character in the Italian fairy tale "Prunella"
- Prunella Gentleman, heroine of the novel Sorcerer of the Crown by Zen Cho

== See also ==
- Prunella (disambiguation)
