= Proulx =

Proulx is a surname. Notable people with the surname include:

- Amédée Wilfrid Proulx, American Catholic Bishop
- Annie Proulx, American journalist and author
- Brooklynn Proulx, Canadian actress
- Christian Proulx, retired Canadian hockey player
- Danielle Proulx, Canadian actress
- Emmanuelle Proulx, lead vocalist of the Canadian indie band Men I Trust
- Lysianne Proulx, a Canadian soccer player
- Matthieu Proulx, Canadian football player
- Monique Proulx, Canadian novelist, short story writer and screenwriter
- Monique Proulx, Canadian racing driver
- John Proulx, jazz pianist, vocalist and composer
- Richard Proulx, composer and organist
- Sébastien Proulx, Canadian politician
- Stéphane Proulx, Canadian racing driver
