= Prunella Fraser =

Prunella Fraser (died 2016) was an architectural historian, writer, archivist and Fellow of the Society of Antiquaries of London. She worked on the cataloguing of architectural drawings at the Royal Institute of British Architects.

== Career ==
While working at the Royal Institute of British Architects, Fraser invented a fixed format to catalogue the RIBA drawings collection, which was further perfected by Jill Lever in her Catalogue Manual.The system has been in use since the 1960s.

She was instrumental in organising The Burlington Collection, a gift of over 500 architectural prints and drawings including works by Palladio, Inigo Jones and Lord Burlington himself. Out of this work, she curated a travelling exhibition with John Harris, curator of drawings at RIBA: the 1961 exhibition included fifty-four architectural drawings under the title “Architectural Drawings from the Collection of the Royal Institute of British Architects.”

== Publications ==
A catalogue of the drawings by Inigo Jones 1573–1652, John Webb 1611–1672 and Richard Boyle, 3rd Earl of Burlington 1694–1753 in the Burlington-Devonshire Collection, by Prunella Fraser and John Harris. Part 1 of Burlington-Devonshire collection, Royal Institute of British Architects, Sir Banister Fletcher Library Drawing Collection.

Fraser contributed to the 1963 Survey of London: Volumes 31 and 32, St James Westminster, Part 2 published by London County Council.

== Professional recognition ==
Prunella Fraser was elected a Fellow of the Society of Antiquaries of London in November 1990.

She checked inscriptions on drawings at the Royal Institute of British Architects in preparation for a public lecture on William Talman, given by Margaret Whinney at the Courtauld Institute of Art in November 1954.

In 1956 she introduced a discussion on British 18th-century drawings in the possession of the RIBA Library.

A collection of Fraser's architectural photographs is held at the Courtauld Institute of Art's Conway Library, which is currently undergoing a digitisation process.

== Personal life ==
Prunella Fraser, née Hodgson, was the only daughter of C. G. Hodgson, of St Albans.

She married the architect, Simon Barron Fraser, at Chelsea Old Church on 23 May 1959.

She lived in Bristol in later life. She died on 25 July 2016.
