= Prue Barron =

British surgeon

Prue Barron MBE FRCSE
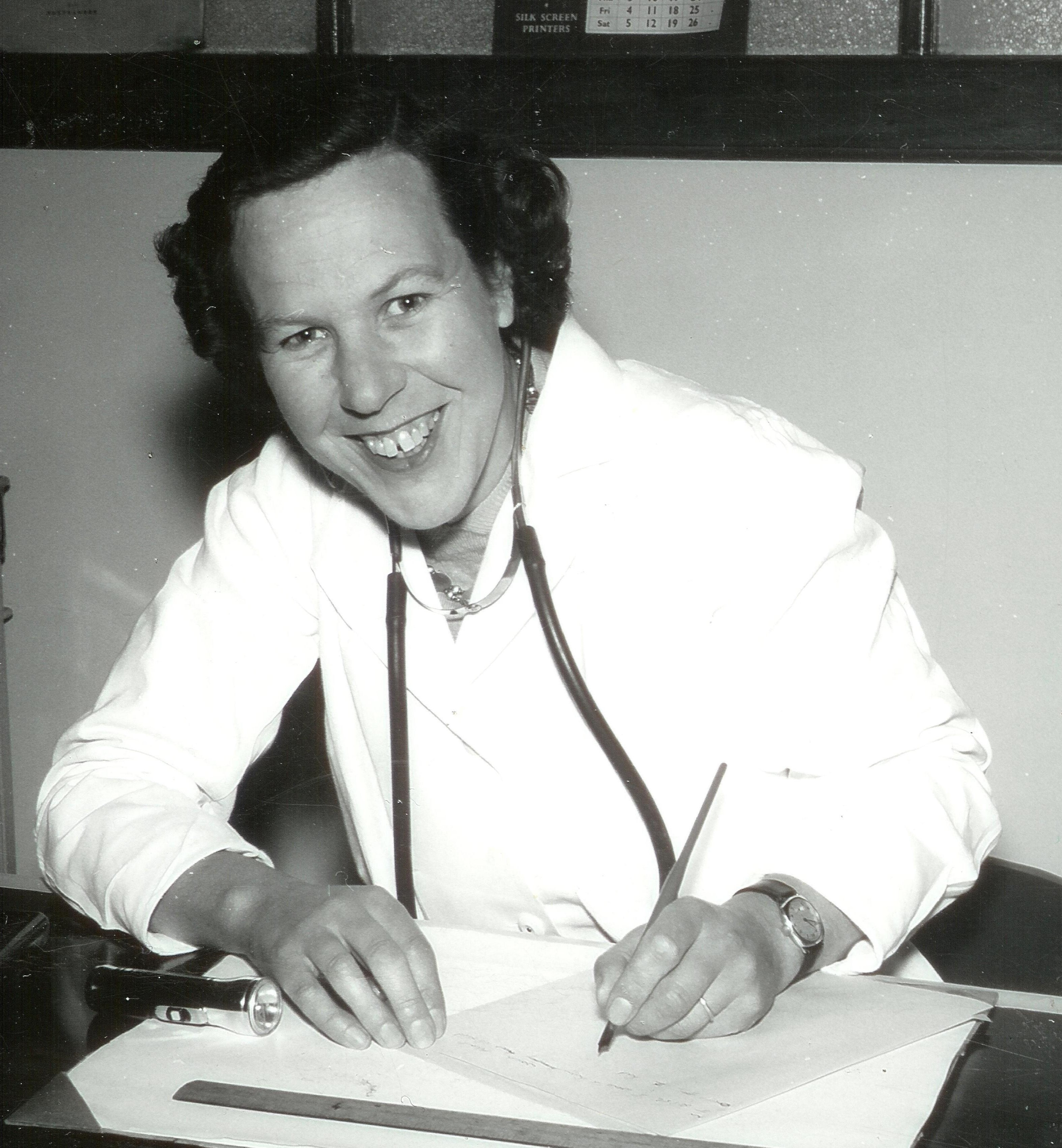
- Born: Prudence Halton; 16 September 1917; Poona, Bombay, British India
- Died: 10 October 2014 (aged 97); Edinburgh, Scotland
- Education: London School of Medicine for Women
- Occupations: surgeon and geriatrician

Prudence Barron MBE FRCSE (16 September 1917 – 10 October 2014) was a British surgeon at the Royal Hospital for Sick Children, Edinburgh and geriatrician.

== Early life and education ==
Prudence Halton was born in Poona, Bombay, in British India on 16 September 1917. Her father, Colonel Frederick Halton, who in peacetime was a solicitor and later the coroner for Cumberland, had been stationed on the North West Frontier during the Third Anglo-Afghan War. Educated as a boarder at Cheltenham Ladies’ College from the age of 12, she became a prefect and then head of house. Her mother encouraged her to apply to the London School of Medicine for Women and she was accepted in 1936, carrying out her undergraduate clinical training at the Royal Free Hospital. She graduated with an MB, BS in 1942.

== Career ==
=== Surgical career ===
Barron worked in house officer posts at the Cumberland Infirmary in Carlisle. She then took up the position of clinical assistant to Gertrude Herzfeld, the first practising woman surgeon in Scotland, at the Royal Hospital for Sick Children in Edinburgh. In July 1945 she became a Fellow of the Royal College of Surgeons of Edinburgh.

She returned to Cumberland Infirmary as assistant surgical resident for a year, before becoming surgical resident at Birmingham Children’s Hospital, where she assisted in the first paediatric open heart surgery to be performed at the hospital. Barron was invited back to Edinburgh by Herzfeld, and was appointed senior surgical registrar at Bruntsfield Hospital in October 1947. She supplemented her salary by demonstrating anatomy to medical students at the University of Edinburgh.

=== Medical career ===
When the youngest of her three children was old enough, she returned part-time to her medical career, initially working as the medical officer at Crawford’s biscuit factory in Edinburgh and later as a general practitioner in a practice on Leith Walk, Edinburgh. In 1967 she was appointed medical officer for geriatrics at Queensberry House and Lodge in the Canongate, Edinburgh, where she was known for her kindness, sensitivity, and compassion, and was also acknowledged as an extremely capable clinician. She was appointed geriatric associate specialist at the Royal Victoria, Corstorphine, and Eastern General hospitals.

When St Columba’s Hospice for palliative care opened in 1977, Barron worked on a voluntary basis, covering weekends and many nights, subsequently as a member of the executive committee until 1993. In addition she worked as a volunteer marriage guidance councillor, and volunteered in the Leith Hospital Samaritan Society. She was chair of the local Medical Women’s Federation and in her retirement chair of the Cruse bereavement counselling service.

== Personal life ==
She met fellow surgeon Arthur F.M. Barron while they worked together as anatomy demonstrators. They married in Carlisle Cathedral in July 1950. He became consultant surgeon to Leith Hospital. He died suddenly in 1971 following a stroke.

Barron underwent successful open heart valve replacement surgery at the age of 92. She died in Edinburgh on 10 October 2014.

== Awards and honours ==
In 1975, she was appointed a Member of the Order of the British Empire (MBE) for services to geriatrics.
