= Queen Garnet =

Variety of plum

- Species: Prunus salicina
- Origin: Australia

The Queen Garnet is a variety of plum, renowned for its deep, almost black color and high antioxidant content. It was developed in Australia, specifically in Queensland and New South Wales.

The Queen Garnet plum is particularly rich in anthocyanins, with 277 mg/100 g, a type of flavonoid with potent antioxidant properties. Studies have shown that the anthocyanin content in Queen Garnet plums can be significantly higher than other common plum varieties. This high anthocyanin content contributes to the deep red color of the fruit and is believed to be responsible for many of its health benefits.

Rights to produce the fruit in Australia are solely owned by Nutrafruit who have the power to grant sub-licenses to produce the fruit. As a result of this tight regulation there have been instances of illegal production and relabelling of other plum varieties to sell as Queen Garnet plums.

== See also ==
- Plum
- List of plum cultigens
