= List of plum cultigens =

Kinds of plum plants that have been altered or selected by humans

This is a list of plum cultigens.

== Table of plums ==
Common name	Image	Color	Additional information	Refs
Alderman		Burgundy	Large yellow fleshed fruit. From Minnesota	
Arandana				
Amber Jewel		Crimson Red	Skin with an orange or gold blush	
AU-Rosa		Red	Hybrid between P. salicina, P. cerasifera, and P. angustifolia. Very disease-resistant.	
Black Amber		Dark Crimson		
Black Ice		Dark Blue	Red flesh and tough skin, vigorous and hardy	
Bullace		Blue		
Casselman		Red	Smooth-skinned and can be either fairly firm or slightly soft and are very sweet	
Damson		Blue		
El Dorado		Dark Purple	Has amber flesh and a sweet flavor even when firm	
Greengage		Green		
Guthrie		Yellow	This is a Chickasaw Plum (P. angustifolia) selection. Native to North America.	
Laetitia plum		Red		
LaCrescent		Yellow	Yellow flesh, freestone	
Lemon plum		Yellow		
Mirabelle		Yellow		
Mount Royal	Mount Royal by S. khanizadeh	Deep blue	Yellow-green flesh, hardiest of the European plums	
Opal		Light red	Bred in Sweden and released in 1925. A cross between a plum and a gage.	
Perdrigon				
Pembina		Red (with blue bloom)	Yellow flesh. From South Dakota	
Pipestone		Red	Very large fruit with yellow sweet juicy flesh, clingstone	
Queen Garnet		Dark red	Red flesh. Rich in anthocyanins. Originated in Australia	
Reine-Claude		Yellow		
Santa Rosa		Red-violet		
Superior		Red	Large fruit with yellow sweet juicy flesh, clingstone	
Toka		Red	Yellow flesh, also known as the bubblegum plum. From South Dakota	
Underwood		Red	From Minnesota, medium yellow fleshed fruit	introduced in 1921 by the University of Minnesota Fruit Breeding Farm, Excelsior, Minnesota. Shiro (P. angustifolia × P. cerasifera × P. salicina × P. simonii × Wyant [P. americana]).
Victoria		Red		La Pocatière and Frelighsburg, Quebec and appears to be self-fruitful.
Waneta		Red	Yellow flesh, prolific. From South Dakota	introduced in 1913 by N.E. Hansen of the South Dakota Experimental Station, South Dakota. Plum (P. salicina × Prunus americana).
