= Amber Jewel =

Cultivar of plum

- Species: Prunus salicina
- Origin: Western Australia

The Amber Jewel is a cultivar of plum, known for its sweet, rich flavor with low acidity, firm texture, and attractive appearance. It is particularly suited for fresh consumption and has gained recognition for its ability to last while in storage.

The Amber Jewel plum is characterized by its medium to large size, with a distinctive red skin overlain by a golden blush. The flesh is a bright amber color.

== Cultivation ==
Amber Jewel plums are primarily grown in regions with temperate climates. They require well-drained soil and adequate sunlight to thrive. Proper pruning and fertilization are essential for optimal fruit production.

== See also ==
- Plum
- List of plum cultigens
