= Cherry plum =

Cherry plum may refer to:

- The species Prunus cerasifera
- Plum-cherry hybrids
- Prunus × rossica cultivars
