= Black Amber (plum) =

Cultivated variety of plum

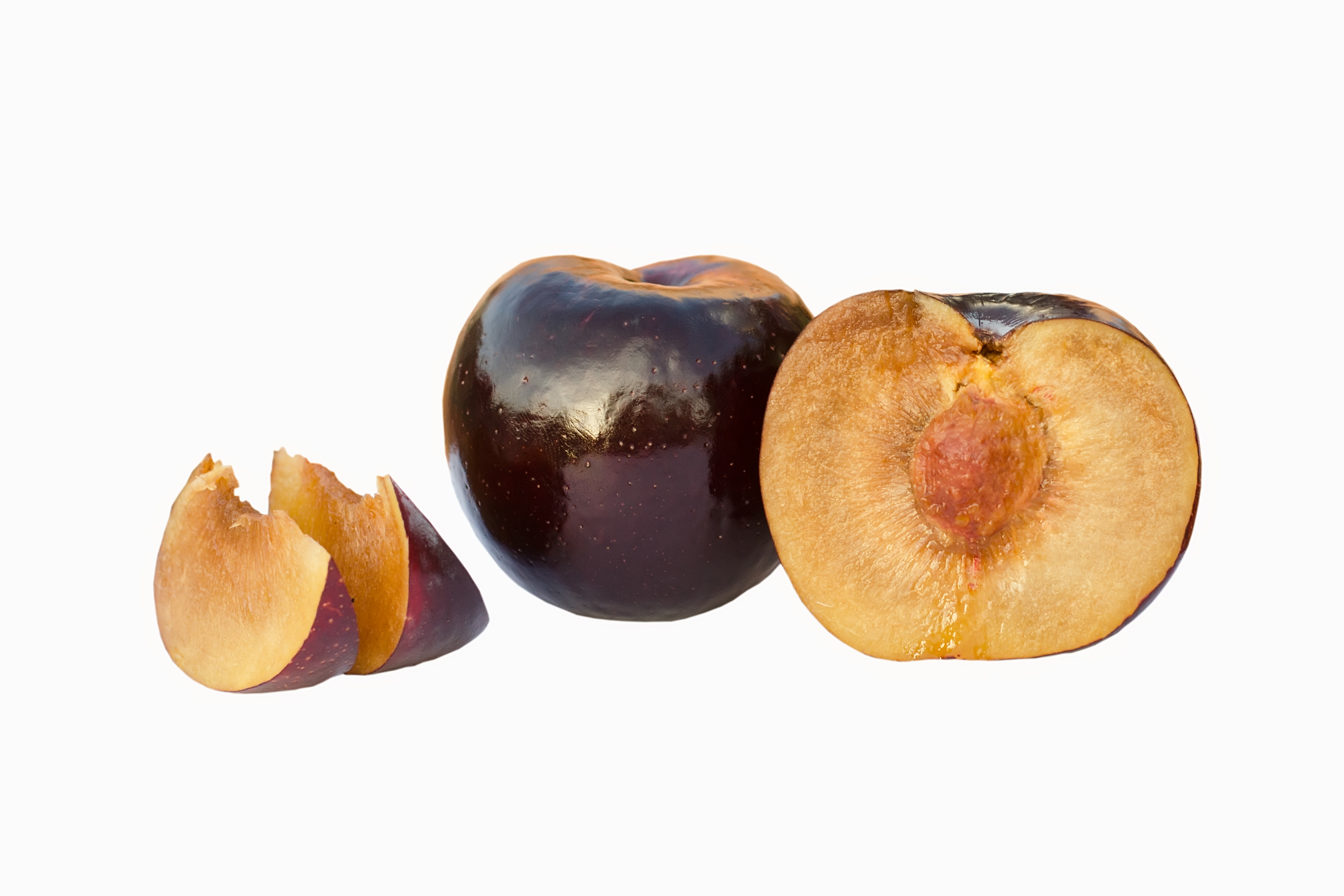
- Species: Prunus salicina
- Origin: California, United States

The Black Amber is a cultivar of the Japanese plum Prunus salicina known for its distinctive dark color and sweet flavor. It is a choice for fresh consumption and is often used in jams, jellies, and other culinary applications.

The Black Amber plum is cultivated in various regions around the world, including North America, Europe, and Australia. It thrives in temperate climates and requires well-drained soil and adequate sunlight.

The quantity of anthocyanins in this plum cultivar is 18.89 ± 0.67 mmol / kg (Diaz-Mula et al. 2008).

== Cultivation ==
Blooming occurs from April to May.

The Black Amber plum originated in Fresno, California, USA. It was developed by John H. Weinberger in 1980 through a crossbreeding of the 'Friar' and 'Queen Rosa' plum varieties.

== See also ==
- Plum
- List of plum cultigens
