= Prunus 'Climax' =

Edible fruit cultivar

- Hybrid parentage: Prunus simonii × Prunus salicina
- Cultivar: 'Climax'
- Marketing names: 'Royal of Van Deman'
- Origin: USA. Santa Rosa, California

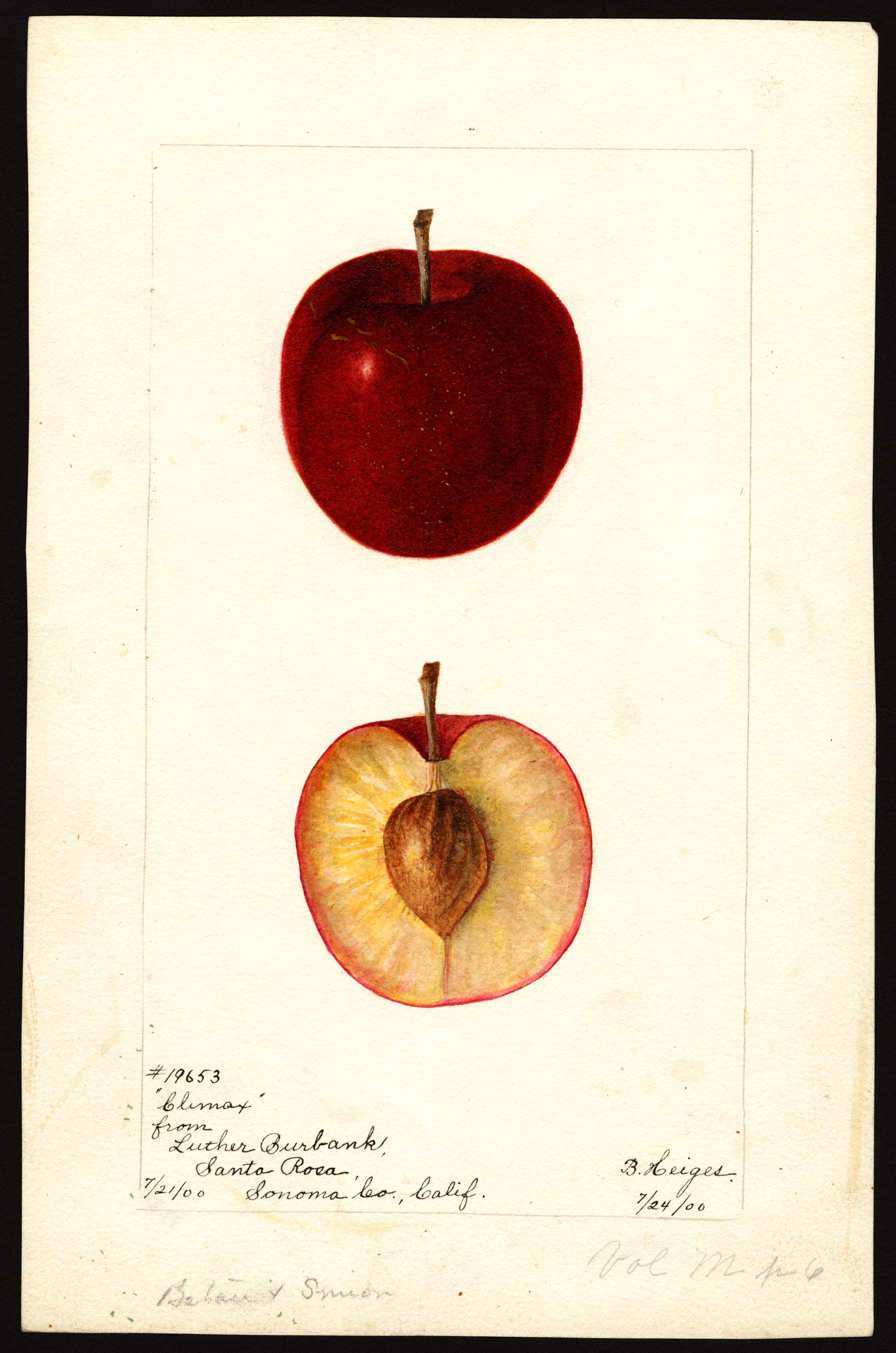

'Climax' is a Prunus cultivar, considered to be a plum. It was introduced in 1899 by plant breeder Luther Burbank.

Burbank devoted a lot of work to hybridizing two plum species, the apricot plum or Simon plum Prunus simonii and the Japanese plum Prunus salicina. He developed a number of cultivars from the hybrid, of which 'Climax' was particularly notable for its importance to the fruit shipping industry of California.

== Description ==
The 'Climax' tree is less productive than some other plum cultivars. The fruit is extremely large and heart-shaped, with yellow flesh that is sweet and very juicy. The flesh clings to the stone. The skin is dark red with yellow spots, and somewhat unpleasant in flavour, but peels away easily from the flesh when the fruit is fully ripe.
