= Arandana =

Variety of plum

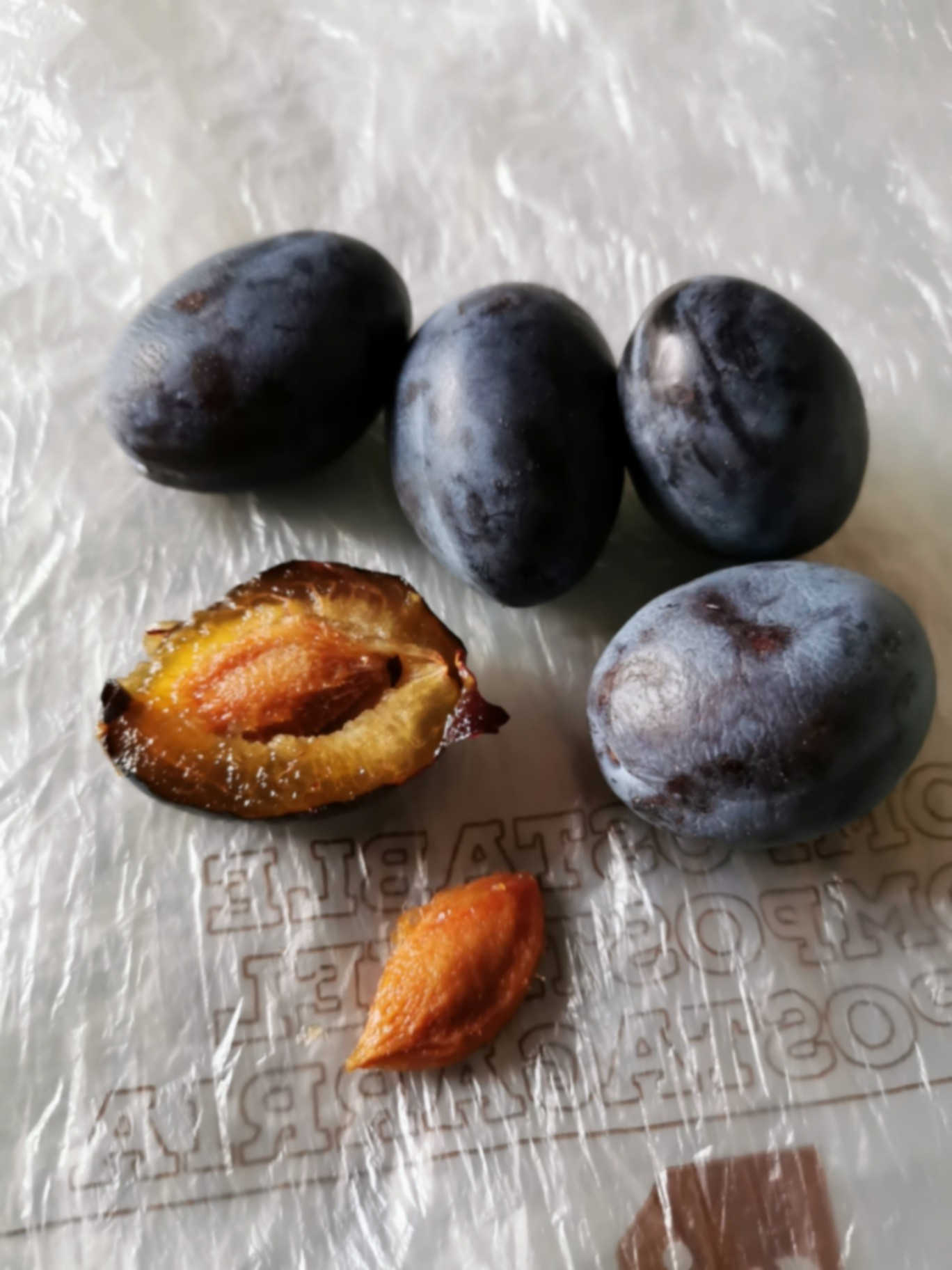
- Species: Prunus domestica
- Origin: Spain

Arandana is a cultivated variety of European plums. It is a variety of plum that is cultivated in the Spanish region of Aragon. The fruits are medium to large in size, with a dark indigo color and fleshy pulp, although they are not very sweet.

== History ==
The Arandana is a plum variety whose origins are unclear, which has been cultivated since the late 19th century in the orchards of Aragon.

Arandana is cultivated in the living germplasm bank of the Aula Dei Experimental Station in Zaragoza. It is considered to be included among the very old local autochthonous varieties, whose cultivation was centered in very defined regions, which are characterized by their good adaptation to their ecosystems, and could have genetic interest due to their organoleptic characteristics and resistance to diseases, with a view to improving other varieties.

== See also ==
- Plum
- Prunus domestica
- List of plum cultigens
