= Plum-cherry hybrid =

Type of hybrid fruit tree

A plum-cherry hybrid is a hybrid between Chinese or Japanese plum (Prunus salicina and its hybrids) and sweet cherry (Prunus avium). Although it is often called cherry plum, it has no relation to the cherry plum species (Prunus cerasifera). It is also known as plerry (more like a plum) or cherum (more like a cherry). Commercial plum-cherry hybrids include 'Nadia', CherriYum!, Verry Cherry Plum (cherum hybrids, including 'Sweet Pixie', 'Sweet Pixie 5', etc.) and Pluerry (complex plerry hybrids).

Not all hybrids marketed as "cherry plums" are plum-cherry hybrids. For example, Sprite Cherry-Plum and Delight Cherry-Plum are actually Russian plums (Prunus × rossica).
