= Asian plum =

The term Asian plum may refer to two varieties of stone fruit from East Asia:

- Prunus mume
- Prunus salicina, native to China

== See also ==
- Spondias mombin (also called "hog plum")
