= Victoria Plum =

Victoria Plum may refer to:

- Victoria plum, an English plum cultivar
- A children's literature character from the 1980s said to be created by Angela Rippon but was actually purchased from a struggling student
- Plum Sykes, (born 1969) the professional name of British novelist and fashion journalist Victoria Rowland
