= Victoria plum =

Plum cultivar

Prunus 'Victoria'
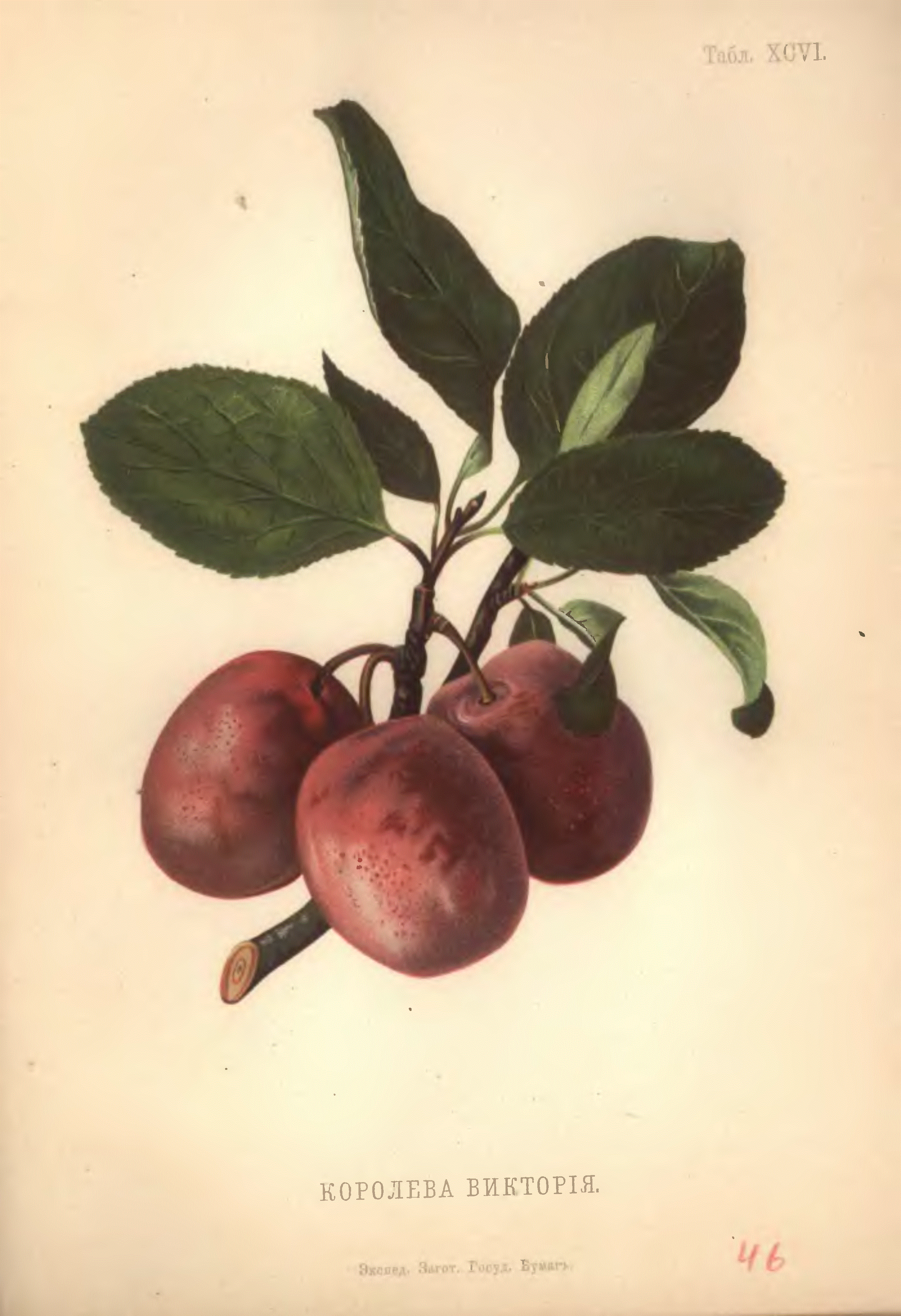
- Species: Prunus domestica
- Cultivar: 'Victoria'
- Origin: Britain

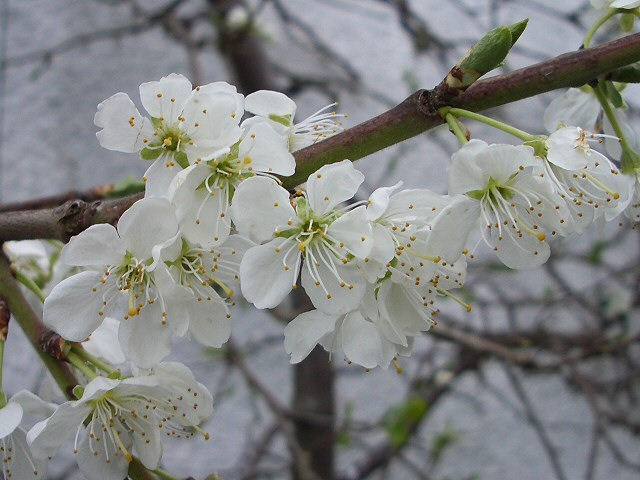
Blossom

The Victoria plum is a type of English plum. It has a yellow flesh with a red or mottled skin. This plum is a cultivar of the egg plum group (Prunus domestica ssp. intermedia).

The fruit is oval or ovate in shape. The ground colour is greenish yellow, mostly covered with purple. The stone is semi-clinging and does not come off completely from the flesh but the skin is easy to pull off. The flesh is quite rough, light yellow and in good development and full maturity is sweet. Maturation time is mid-to-late September (in some places). It is a good table and household fruit.

The tree is quite hardy and grows strongly but is not very large. The bloom is medium-early and self-fertile. The plant itself is rarely attacked by diseases, but the fruit is vulnerable to mold. Fruits must be thinned heavily for the fruits to reach full development. The trees rarely get old due to their high fruit production.

In 2015, 15.5 tonnes of Victoria plums were grown and made available for sale within the UK.

The name "Victoria" comes from Queen Victoria (1819–1901). A story that the variety was first discovered in a garden in Alderton, Suffolk.

It was introduced commercially in Sweden in 1844 by a nursery owner, Denyer, under the name of Denyer's Victoria. This strain quickly became very popular in Sweden in the late 19th century.

The Victoria plum contains the anthocyanin chrysanthemin.

== See also ==
- List of foods named after people
