= Prunus × rossica =

Scientific classification
- Kingdom: Plantae
- Clade: Tracheophytes
- Clade: Angiosperms
- Clade: Eudicots
- Clade: Rosids
- Order: Rosales
- Family: Rosaceae
- Genus: Prunus
- Subgenus: Prunus subg. Prunus
- Section: Prunus sect. Prunus
- Species: P. × rossica

Binomial name
- Prunus × rossica Eremin

Nothospecies of plant

Prunus × rossica, the Russian plum, is a hybrid cultigen between cherry plum (Prunus cerasifera) and Chinese or Japanese plum (Prunus salicina). It is of commercial importance in the European Russia, and there are many cultivars developed there, such as 'Gek', 'Desertnaya', 'Kubanskaya Kometa', 'Obilnaja'.

In the US, a few cultivars have also been developed, such as Sprite Cherry-Plum and Delight Cherry-Plum.

The South African cultivar 'Methley' is also a cultivar of P. × rossica.
