= Plum =

Edible fruit

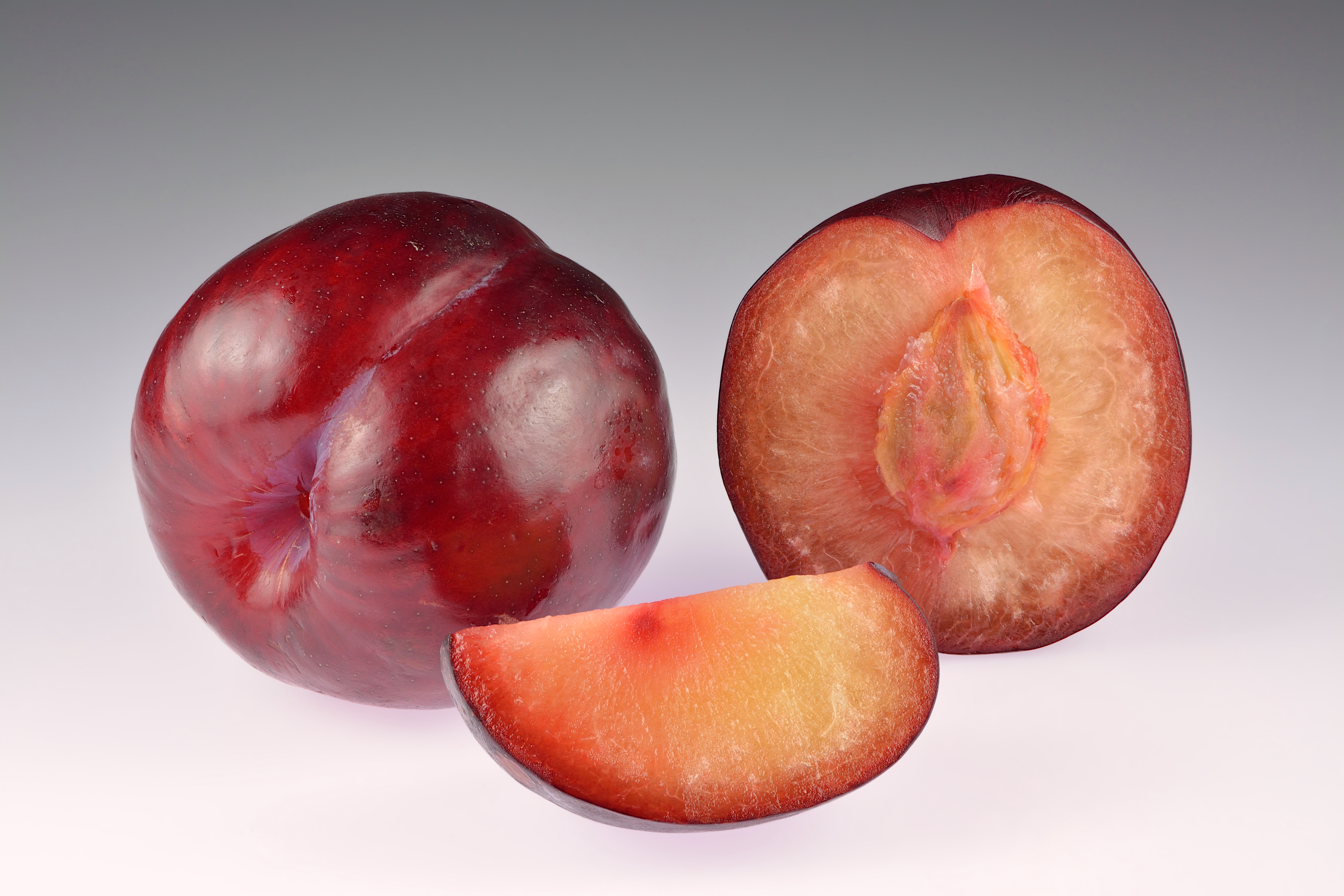
African Rose plums (Japanese or Chinese plum)

A plum is a fruit of some species in Prunus subg. Prunus. Dried plums are usually called prunes.

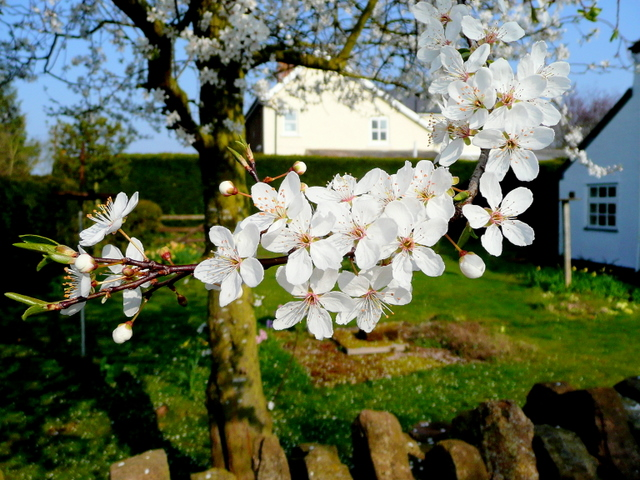
Plum flowers

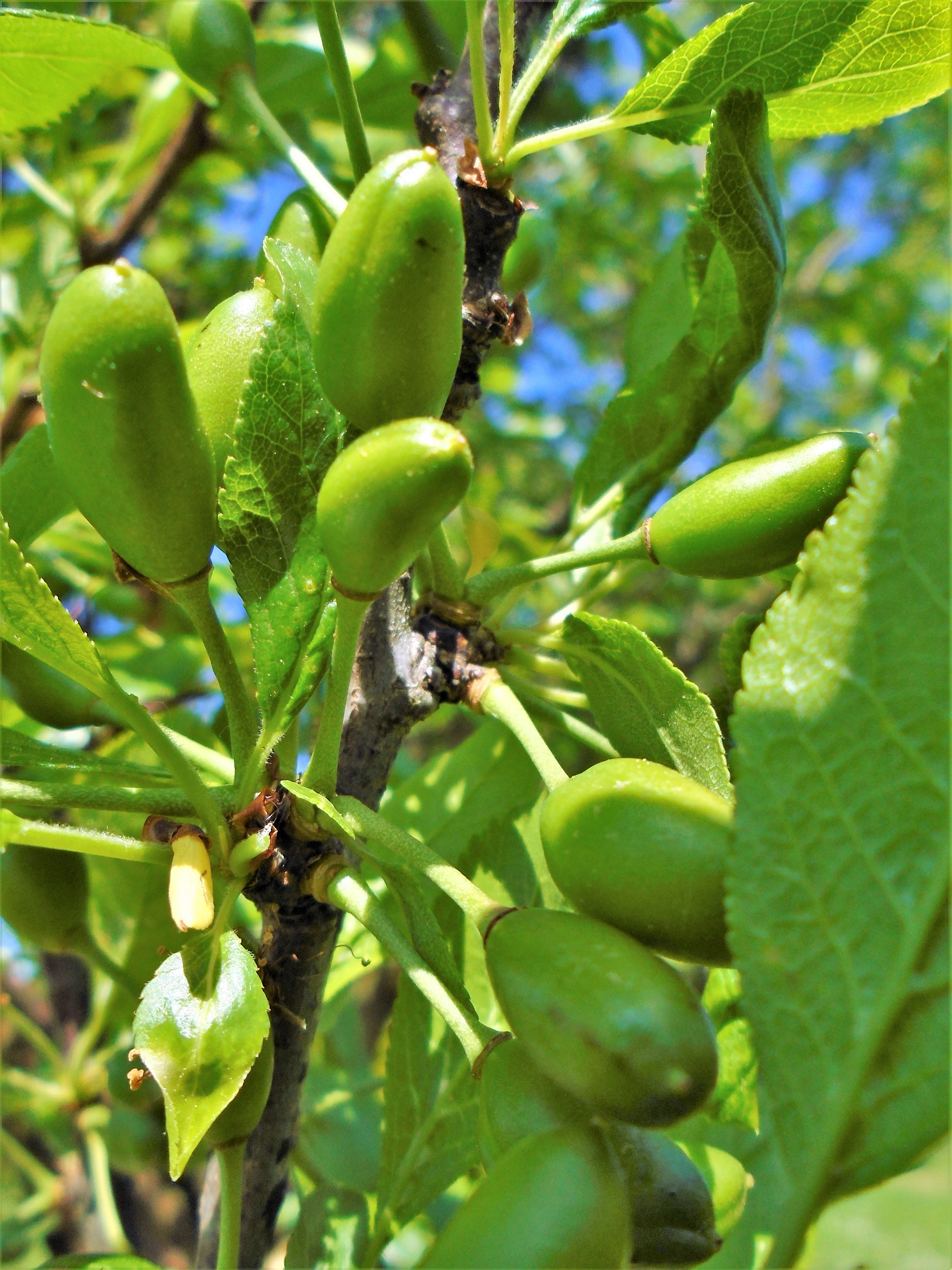
Plum unripe fruits

Plums are likely to have been one of the first fruits domesticated by humans, with origins in Eastern Europe, the Caucasus Mountains and China. They were brought to Britain from Asia, and their cultivation has been documented in Andalusia, southern Spain. Plums are a diverse group of species, with trees reaching a height of 5–6 metres (16–20 ft) when pruned. The fruit is a drupe, with a firm and juicy flesh. Plums can be eaten fresh, dried to make prunes, used in jams, or fermented into wine and distilled into brandy. Plum seeds (also called kernels) contain the cyanide-like poison, amygdalin, a cyanogenic glycoside.

In 2023, China produced 55% of the world total of plums. Japanese or Chinese plums dominate the fresh fruit market, while European plums are also common in some regions.

== History ==
Plums are likely to have been one of the first fruits domesticated by humans. Three of the most abundantly cultivated species are not found in the wild, only around human settlements: Prunus domestica has been traced to East European and Caucasian mountains, while Prunus salicina and Prunus simonii originated in China. Plum remains have been found in Neolithic age archaeological sites along with olives, grapes and figs. According to Ken Albala, plums originated in Iran. They were brought to Britain from Asia.

An article on plum tree cultivation in Andalusia (southern Spain) appears in Ibn al-'Awwam's 12th-century agricultural work, Book on Agriculture.

Plum cultivation is recorded in medieval monasteries in England. A garden with 'ploumes' and 'bulaces' is referred to by Chaucer.

The cultivation of plums increased during the 17th and 18th centuries. During this period greengages were given their English name and the Mirabelle plum became firmly established. Advances in the development of new varieties in England were made by Thomas Rivers. Two examples of River's work are the varieties Early Rivers and Czar. Both are still esteemed. The fame of the Victoria plum, first sold in 1844, has been put down to good marketing rather than any inherent quality.

== Etymology and names ==
The name plum comes from Old English plūme "plum, plum tree", an evolution of plūmā, which was a common West Germanic loanword from Latin prūnum, which borrowed it from Ancient Greek προῦμνον : proûmnon, itself believed to be a loanword from an unknown language of Asia Minor. In the late 18th century, the word plum was used to indicate "something sweet or agreeable", probably in reference to tasty fruit pieces in desserts, as in the word sugar plum.

== Description ==
Plums are a diverse group of species. The commercially important plum trees are medium-sized, usually pruned to 5–6 metres (16–20 ft) height. The tree is of medium hardiness. Without pruning, the trees can reach 12 metres (39 ft) in height and spread across 10 metres (33 ft). They blossom in different months in different parts of the world; for example, in about January in Taiwan and early April in the United Kingdom.

Fruits are usually of medium size, between 2–7 centimetres (0.79–2.76 in) in diameter, globose to oval. The flesh is firm and juicy. The fruit's peel is smooth, with a natural waxy surface that adheres to the flesh. The plum is a drupe, meaning its fleshy fruit surrounds a single hard fruitstone which encloses the fruit's seed.

== Cultivation and uses ==
Japanese or Chinese plums are large and juicy with a long shelf life and therefore dominate the fresh fruit market. They are usually clingstone and not suitable for making prunes. They are cultivars of Prunus salicina or its hybrids. The cultivars developed in the US are mostly hybrids of P. salicina with P. simonii and P. cerasifera. Although these cultivars are often called Japanese plums, two of the three parents (P. salicina and P. simonii) originated from China and one (P. cerasifera) from Eurasia.

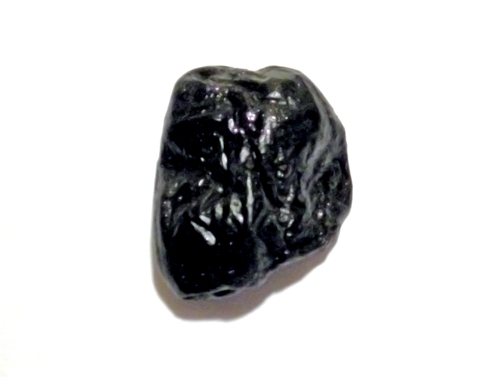
Prune, a dried plum

In some parts of Europe, European plum (Prunus domestica) is also common in fresh fruit market. It has both dessert (eating) or culinary (cooking) cultivars, which include:

- Damson (purple or black skin, green flesh, clingstone, astringent)
- Prune plum (usually oval, freestone, sweet, fresh eaten or used to make prunes)
- Greengage (firm, green flesh and skin even when ripe)
- Mirabelle (dark yellow, predominantly grown in northeast France)
- Victoria (yellow flesh with a red or mottled skin)
- Yellowgage or golden plum (similar to greengage, but yellow)

In West Asia, myrobalan plum or cherry plum (Prunus cerasifera) is also widely cultivated. In Russia, apart from these three commonly cultivated species, there are also many cultivars resulting from hybridization between Japanese plum and myrobalan plum, known as Russian plum (Prunus × rossica).

When it flowers in the early spring, a plum tree will be covered in blossoms, and in a good year approximately 50% of the flowers will be pollinated and become plums. Flowering starts after 80 growing degree days.

If the weather is too dry, the plums will not develop past a certain stage, but will fall from the tree while still tiny, green buds, and if it is unseasonably wet or if the plums are not harvested as soon as they are ripe, the fruit may develop a fungal condition called brown rot. Brown rot is not toxic, and some affected areas can be cut out of the fruit, but unless the rot is caught immediately, the fruit will no longer be edible. Plum is used as a food plant by the larvae of some Lepidoptera, including November moth, willow beauty and short-cloaked moth.

The taste of the plum fruit ranges from sweet to tart; the skin itself may be particularly tart. It is juicy and can be eaten fresh or used in jam-making or other recipes. Plum juice can be fermented into plum wine. In central England, a cider-like alcoholic beverage known as plum jerkum is made from plums. Dried, salted plums are used as a snack, sometimes known as saladito or salao.

Plum production 2023, tonnes
China	6,888,895
Romania	645,090
Chile	433,934
Serbia	362,713
Turkey	355,132
Iran	354,789
World	12,489,827
Source: FAOSTAT of the United Nations

Various flavors of dried plum are available at Chinese grocers and specialty stores worldwide. They tend to be much drier than the standard prune. Cream, ginseng, spicy, and salty are among the common varieties. Licorice is generally used to intensify the flavor of these plums and is used to make salty plum drinks and toppings for shaved ice or baobing. Pickled plums are another type of preserve available in Asia and international specialty stores. The Japanese variety, called umeboshi, is often used for rice balls, called onigiri or omusubi. The ume, from which umeboshi are made, is more closely related, however, to the apricot than to the plum.

In the Balkans, plum is converted into an alcoholic drink named slivovitz (plum brandy, called in Bosnian, Croatian, Montenegrin or Serbian šljivovica). A large number of plums, of the Damson variety, are also grown in Hungary, where they are called szilva and are used to make lekvar (a plum paste jam), palinka (traditional fruit brandy), plum dumplings, and other foods. In Romania, 80% of the plum production is used to create a similar brandy, called țuică.

As with many other members of the rose family, plum kernels contain cyanogenic glycosides, including amygdalin. Prune kernel oil is made from the fleshy inner part of the pit of the plum. Though not available commercially, the wood of plum trees is used by hobbyists and other private woodworkers for musical instruments, knife handles, inlays, and similar small projects.

Production of plums

Plum yield

Different plum cultivars

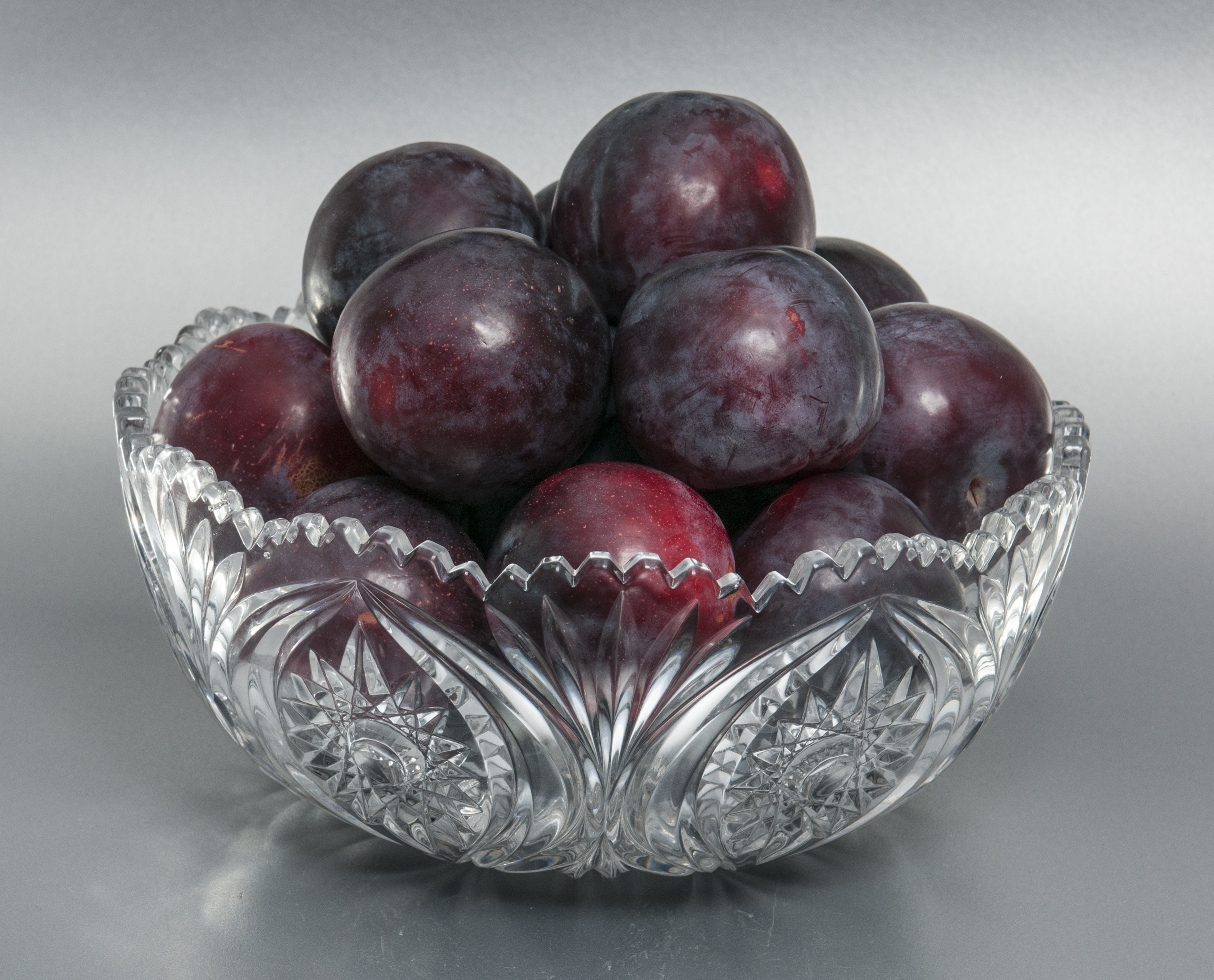
Japanese or Chinese plum

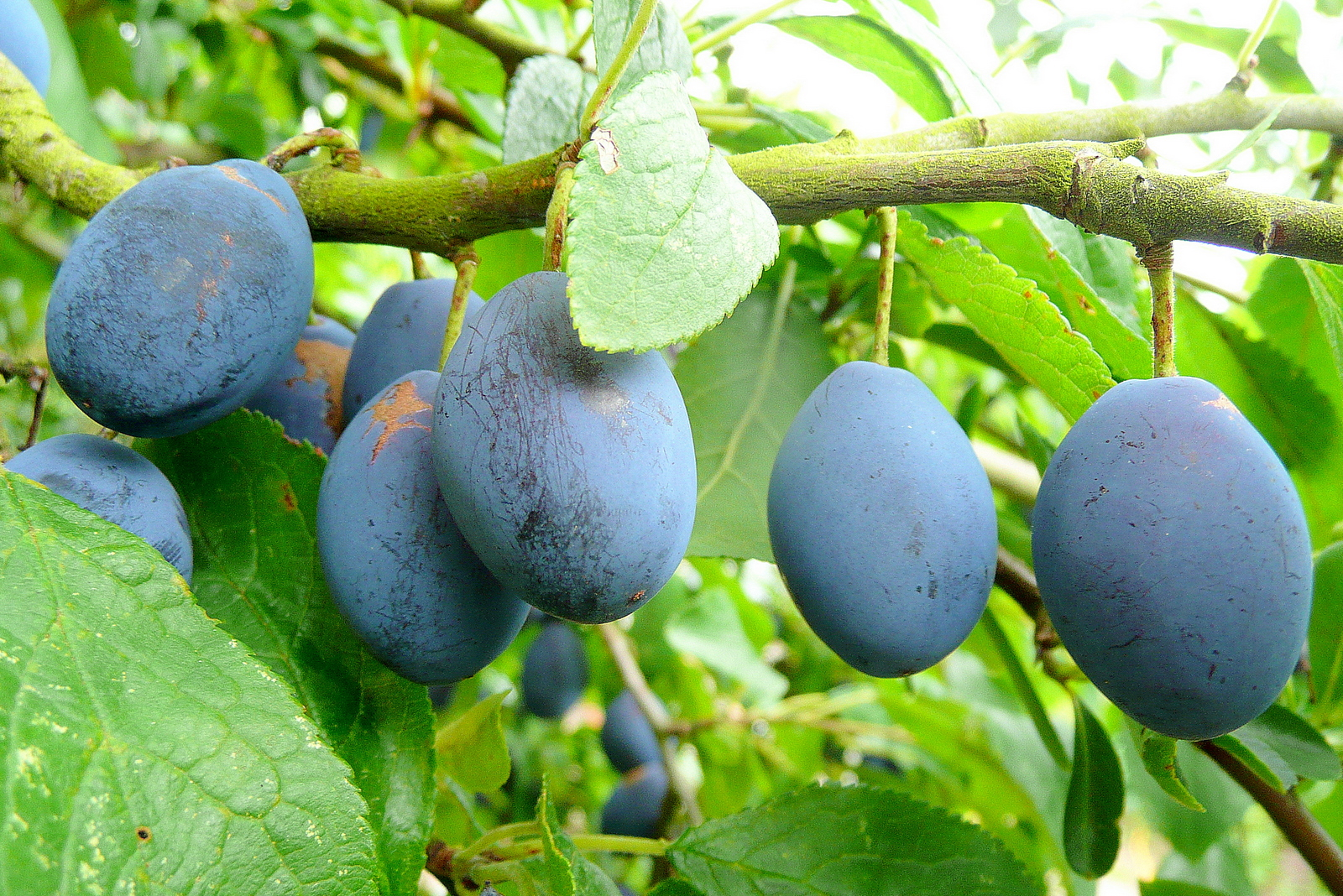
Damsons (European plum)

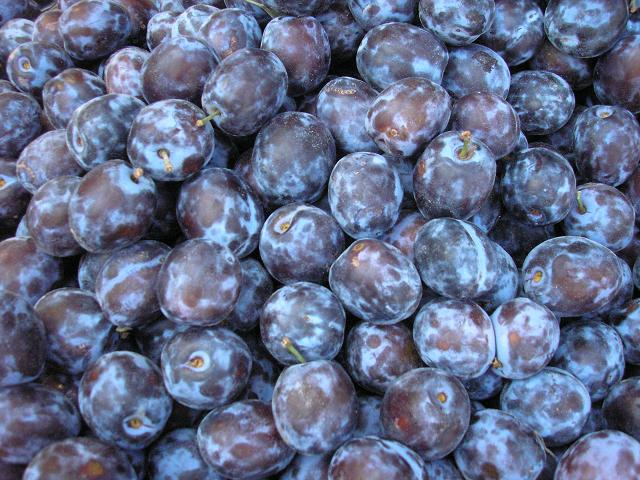
Prune plums (European plum)

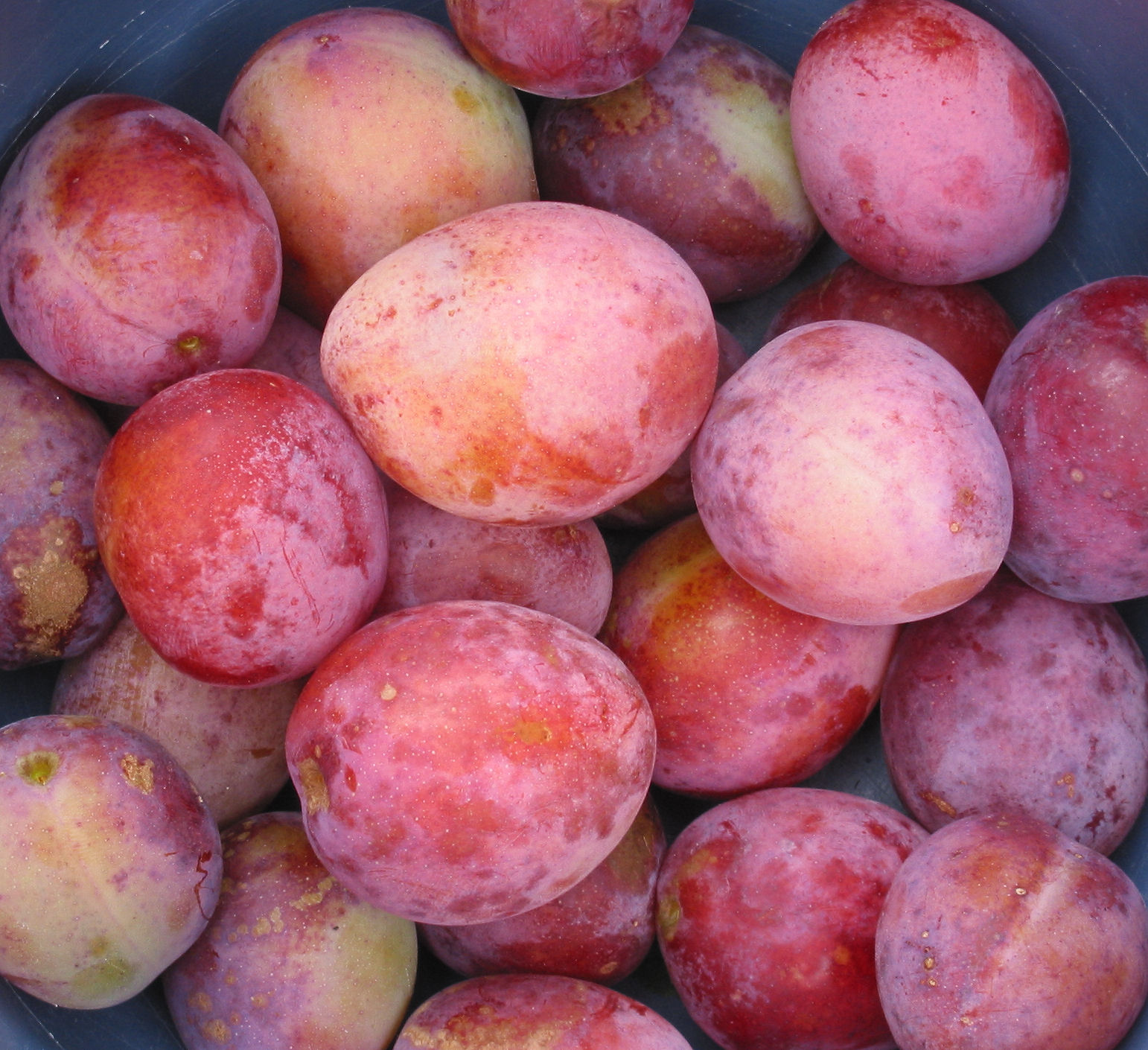
Victoria plums (European plum)

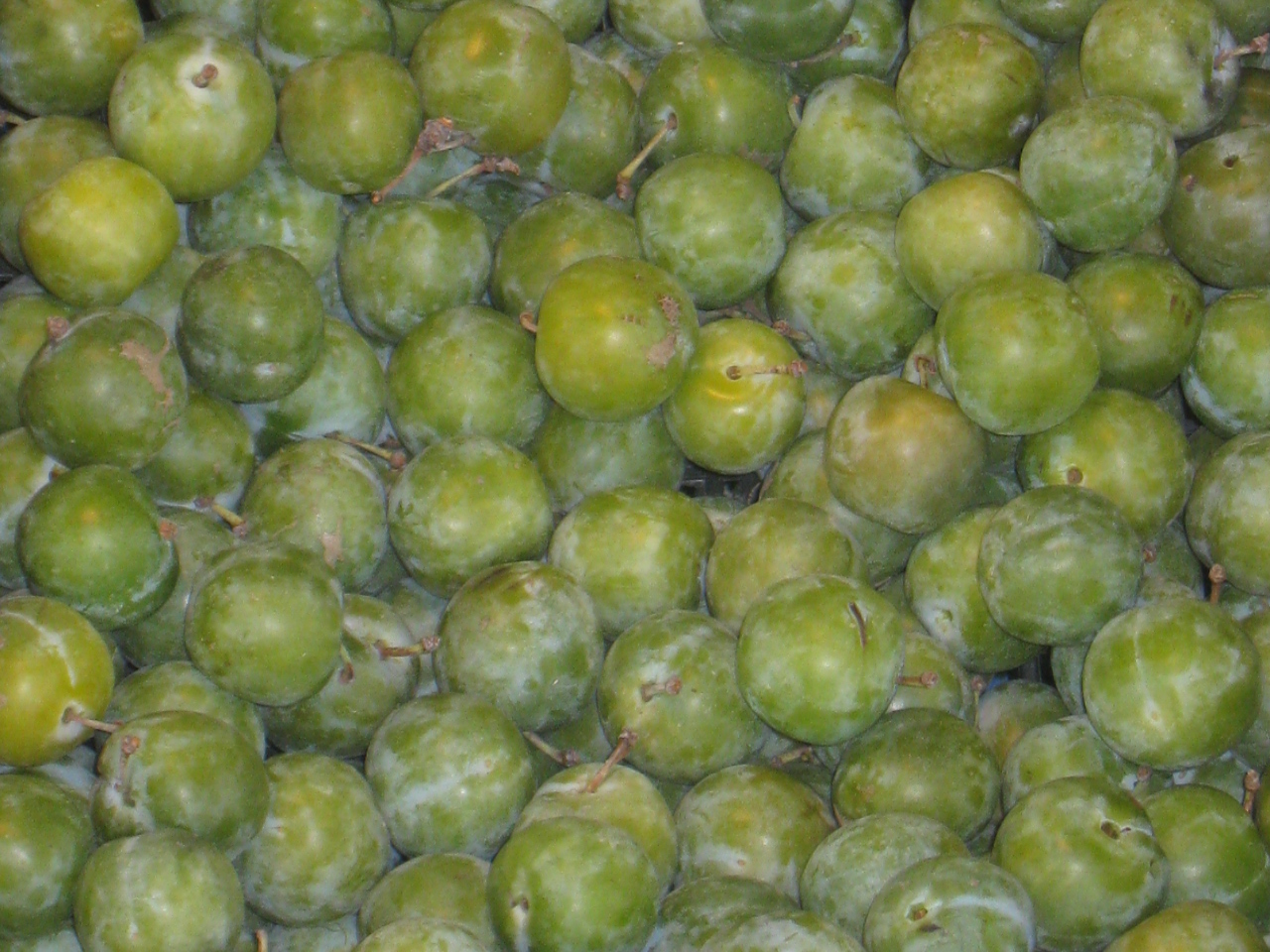
Greengages (European plum)

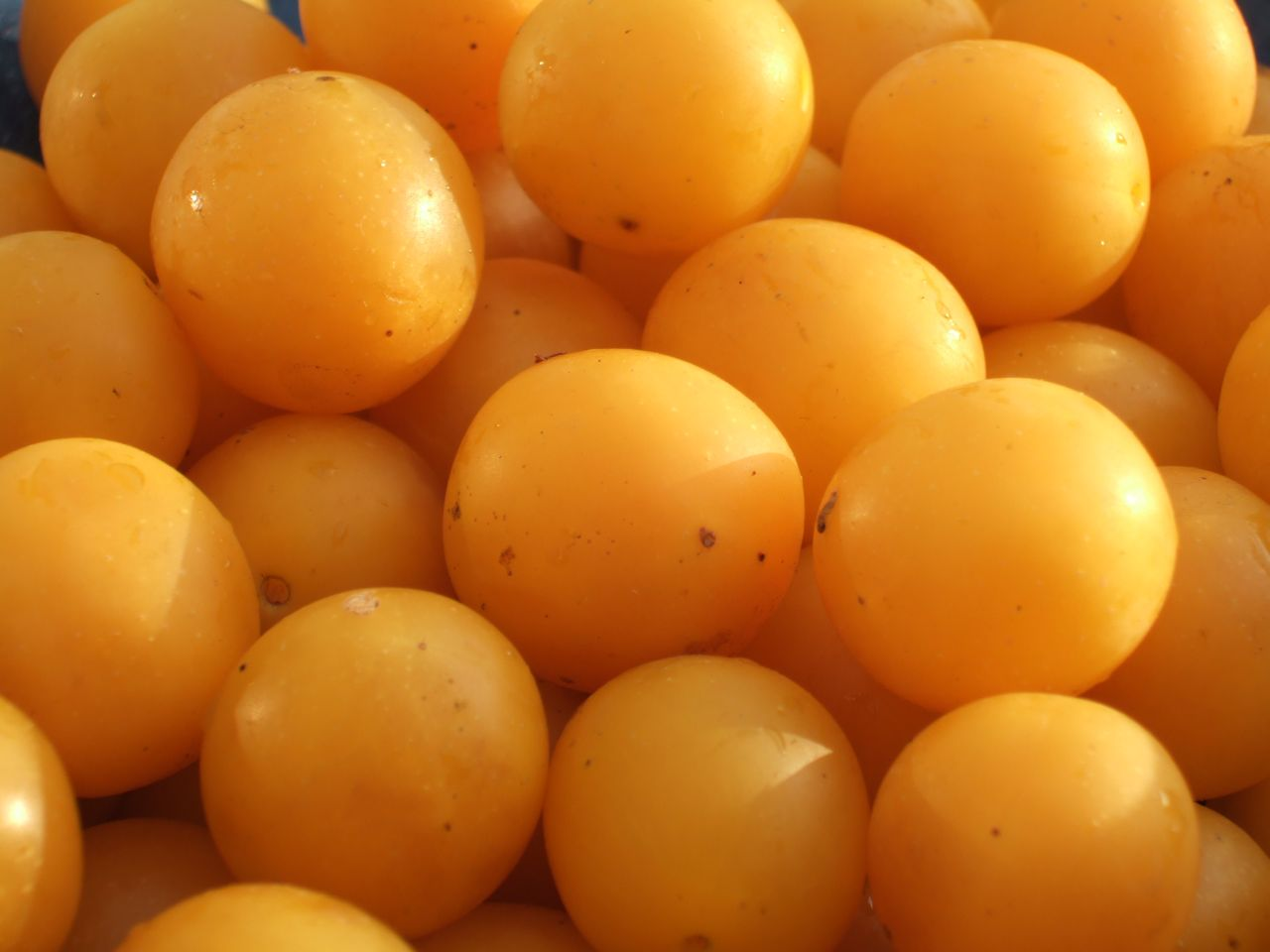
Mirabelles (European plum)

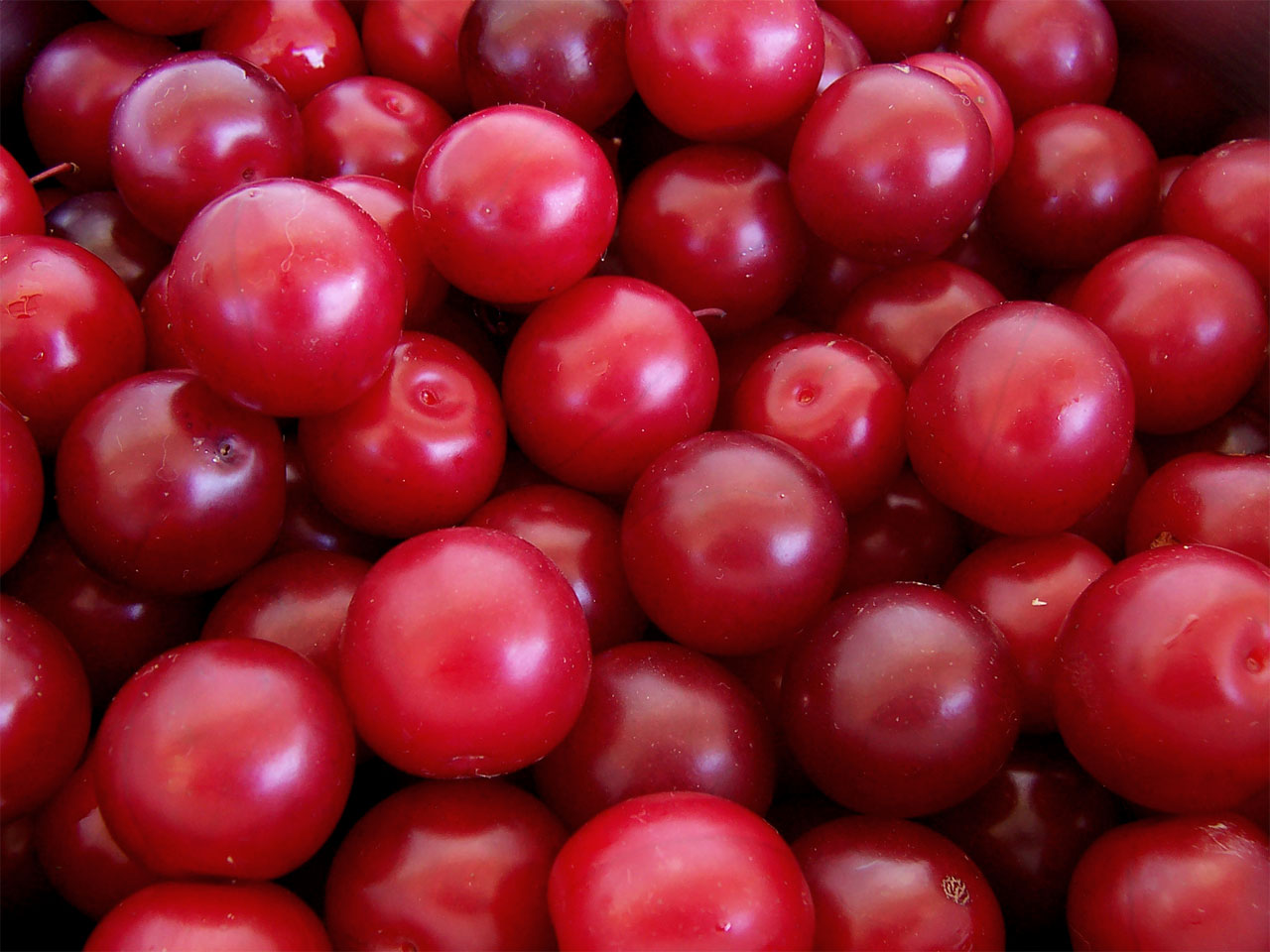
Myrobalan or cherry plums

== Production ==
In 2023, world production of plums (data combined with sloes) was 12.5 million tonnes, led by China with 55% of the total, and Romania and Chile as the next largest producers (table).

Plums, raw
Nutritional value per 100 g (3.5 oz)
- Energy: 192 kJ (46 kcal)
- Carbohydrates: 11.42 g
- Sugars: 9.92 g
- Dietary fiber: 1.4 g
- Fat: 0.28 g
- Protein: 0.7 g
Vitamins and minerals
Vitamins	Quantity %DV^{†}
Vitamin A equiv. beta-Carotene lutein zeaxanthin	2% 17 μg 2% 190 μg 73 μg
Thiamine (B1)	2% 0.028 mg
Riboflavin (B2)	2% 0.026 mg
Niacin (B3)	3% 0.417 mg
Pantothenic acid (B5)	3% 0.135 mg
Vitamin B6	2% 0.029 mg
Folate (B9)	1% 5 μg
Vitamin C	11% 9.5 mg
Vitamin E	2% 0.26 mg
Vitamin K	5% 6.4 μg
Minerals	Quantity %DV^{†}
Calcium	0% 6 mg
Iron	1% 0.17 mg
Magnesium	2% 7 mg
Manganese	2% 0.052 mg
Phosphorus	1% 16 mg
Potassium	5% 157 mg
Sodium	0% 0 mg
Zinc	1% 0.1 mg
- Other constituents: Quantity
- Water: 87 g
- Link to USDA Database entry
- ^{†}Percentages estimated using US recommendations for adults, except for potassium, which is estimated based on expert recommendation from the National Academies.

== Nutrition ==
Raw plums are 87% water, 11% carbohydrates, 1% protein, and less than 1% fat (table). In a reference amount of 100 grams (3.5 oz), raw plums supply 46 calories of food energy, and are a moderate source only of vitamin C (11% of the Daily Value), with no other micronutrients in significant content (table).

== Species ==
The numerous species of Prunus subg. Prunus are classified into many sections, but not all of them are called plums. Plums include species of sect. Prunus and sect. Prunocerasus, as well as P. mume of sect. Armeniaca. Only two plum species, the hexaploid European plum (Prunus domestica) and the diploid Japanese plum (Prunus salicina and hybrids), are of worldwide commercial significance. The origin of P. domestica is uncertain but may have involved P. cerasifera and possibly P. spinosa as ancestors. Other species of plum variously originated in Europe, Asia and America.

Sect. Prunus (Old World plums) – leaves in bud rolled inwards; flowers 1–3 together; fruit smooth, often wax-bloomed

Image	Scientific name	Common name	Distribution	Cytology
	P. brigantina	Briançon plum, Briançon apricot, marmot plum	Europe	
	P. cerasifera	cherry plum, myrobalan plum	Southeast Europe and Western Asia	2n=16,(24)
	P. cocomilia	Italian plum	Albania, Croatia, Greece, southern Italy (including Sicily), Montenegro, North Macedonia, Serbia, and western Turkey	
	P. domestica (species of most "plums" and "prunes")		Europe	2n=16, 48
	P. domestica ssp. insititia	damsons, bullaces	Asia	
	P. salicina	Chinese plum	China	2n=16,(24)
Picture of Prunus simonii	P. simonii (widely cultivated in North China)		China	2n=16
	P. spinosa	blackthorn or sloe	Europe, western Asia, and locally in northwest Africa	2n=4x=32
	P. vachuschtii	Alucha	Caucasus	

Sect. Prunocerasus (New World plums) – leaves in bud folded inwards; flowers 3–5 together; fruit smooth, often wax-bloomed

Image	Scientific name	Common name	Distribution	Cytology
	P. alleghaniensis	Allegheny plum	the Appalachian Mountains from New York to Kentucky and North Carolina, plus the Lower Peninsula of Michigan	
	P. americana	American plum	North America from Saskatchewan and Idaho south to New Mexico and east to Québec, Maine and Florida	
	P. angustifolia	Chickasaw plum	Florida west as far as New Mexico and California	
	P. gracilis	Oklahoma plum	Alabama, Arkansas, Colorado, Kansas, Louisiana, New Mexico, Oklahoma and Texas	
	P. hortulana	Hortulan plum	Arkansas, Iowa, Illinois, Indiana, Kansas, Kentucky, Massachusetts, Maryland, Missouri, Nebraska, Ohio, Oklahoma, Tennessee, Texas, Virginia, West Virginia	
	P. maritima	Beach plum	East Coast of the United States, from Maine south to Maryland	
	P. mexicana	Mexican plum	central United States and Northern Mexico	
	P. murrayana	Murray's plum	Texas	
	P. nigra	Canada plum, Black plum	eastern North America from Nova Scotia west to Minnesota and southeastern Manitoba, and south as far as Connecticut, Illinois, and Iowa	
	P. × orthosepala (P. americana × P. angustifolia)		southern and central United States	
	P. reverchonii	Thicket plum		
	P. rivularis	River plum, Creek plum, Wildgoose plum	California, Arkansas, southern Illinois, south-eastern Kansas, Kentucky, northern Louisiana, Mississippi, Missouri, south-western Ohio, Oklahoma, Tennessee, and Texas	
	P. subcordata	Klamath, Oregon, or Sierra plum	California and western and southern Oregon	
	P. texana	Texas plum, Sand plum, Peachbush plum	central and western Texas	
	P. umbellata	Hog plum, Flatwoods plum, Sloe plum	United States from Virginia, south to Florida, and west to Texas	

Sect. Armeniaca (apricots) – leaves in bud rolled inwards; flowers very short-stalked; fruit velvety; treated as a distinct subgenus by some authors

Image	Scientific name	Common name	Distribution	Cytology
	P. mume	Chinese plum, Japanese apricot	Western Asia	

In certain parts of the world, some fruits are called plums and are quite different from fruits known as plums in Europe or the Americas. For example, marian plums are popular in Thailand, Malaysia and Indonesia, otherwise also known as gandaria, plum mango, ma-praang, ma-yong, ramania, kundang, rembunia or setar. Another example is the loquat, also known as Japanese plum and Japanese medlar, as well as nispero, bibassier and wollmispel elsewhere. In South Asia and Southeast Asia, Jambul, a fruit from tropical tree in family Myrtaceae, is similarly sometimes referred to 'damson plums', and it is different from damson plums found in Europe and Americas. Jambul is also called as Java plum, Malabar plum, Jaman, Jamun, Jamblang, Jiwat, Salam, Duhat, Koeli, Jambuláo or Koriang.

== Gallery ==
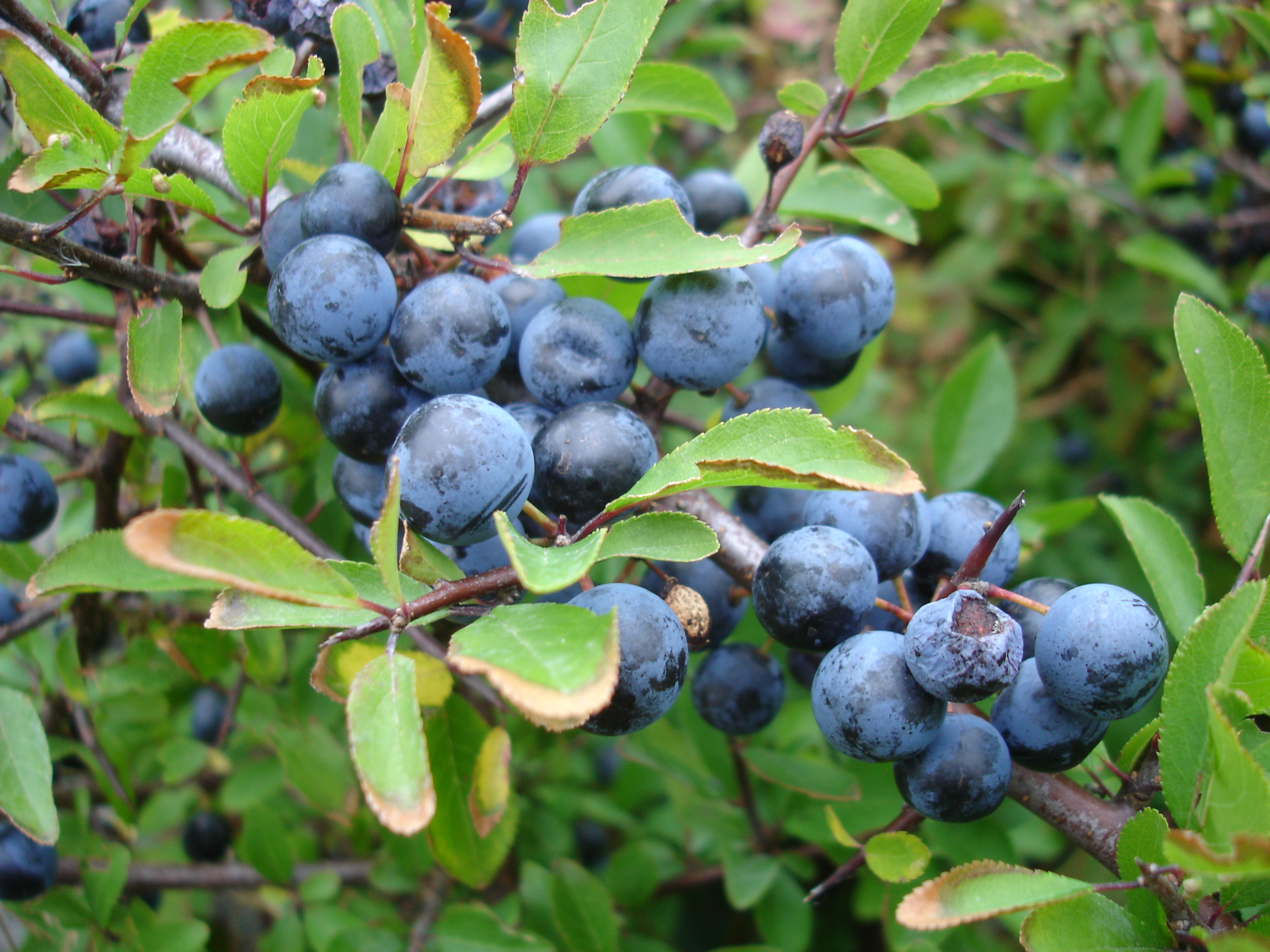
Sloe or blackthorn, Prunus spinosa

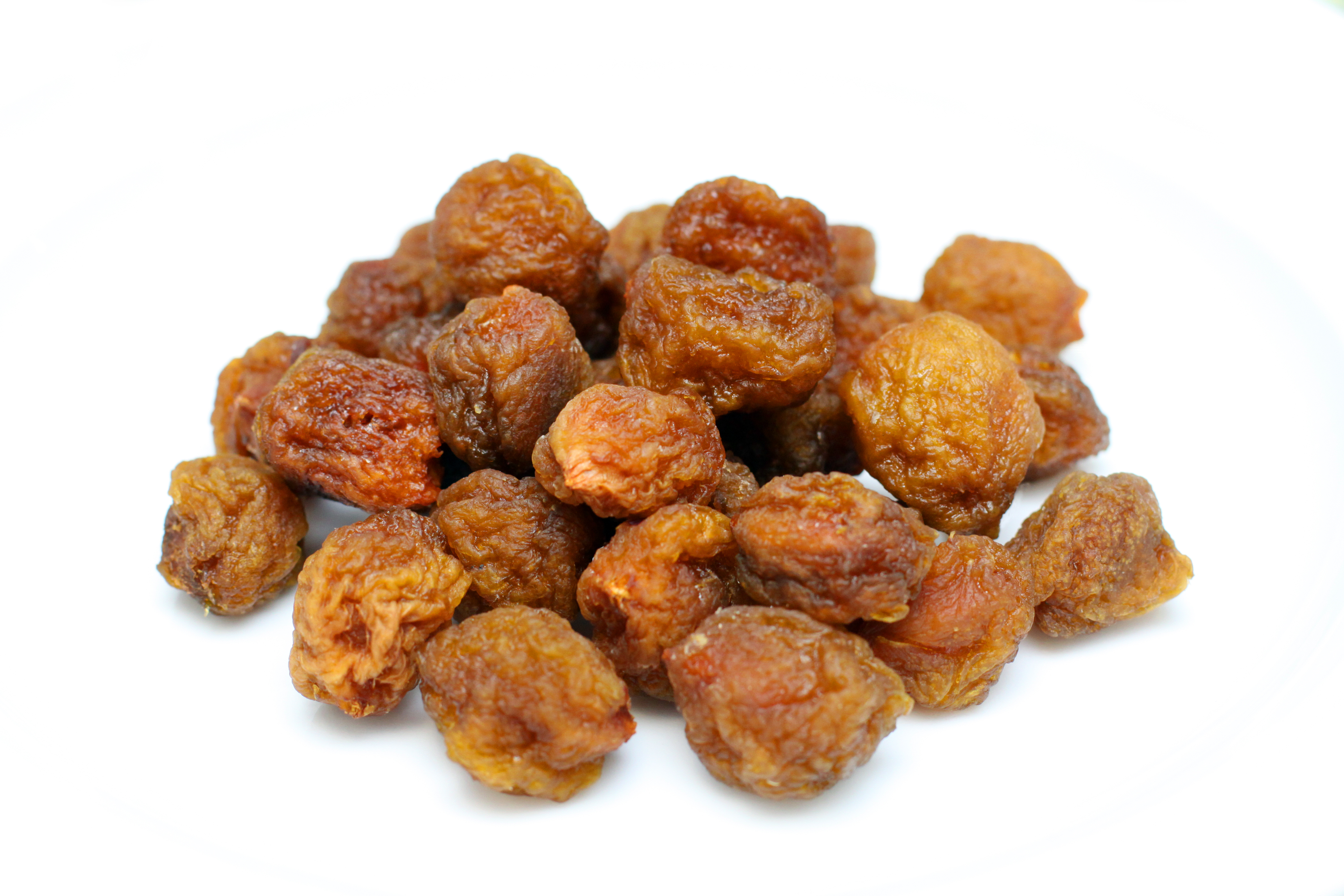
Dried yellow plums

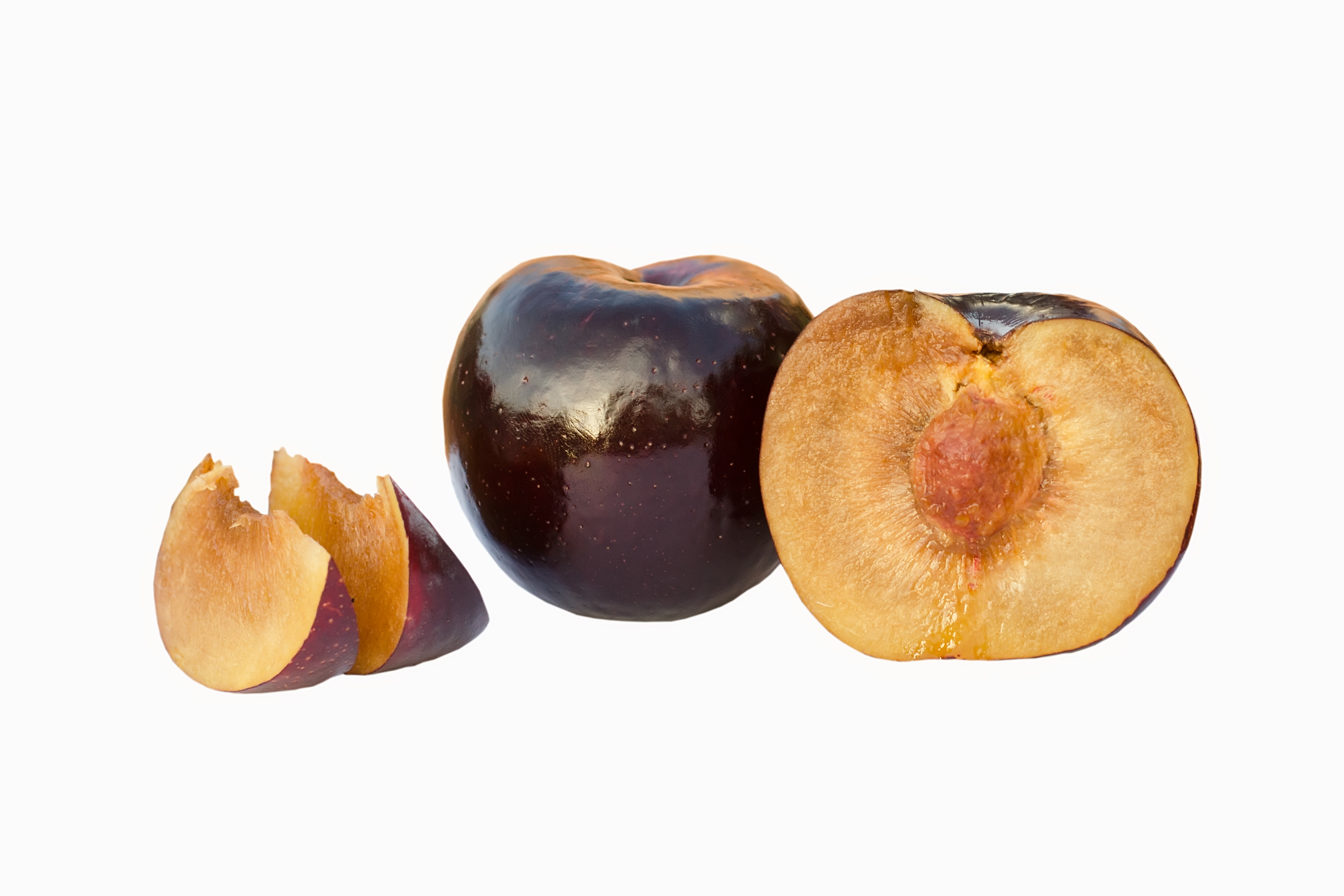
Black Amber Plum (Japanese or Chinese plum)

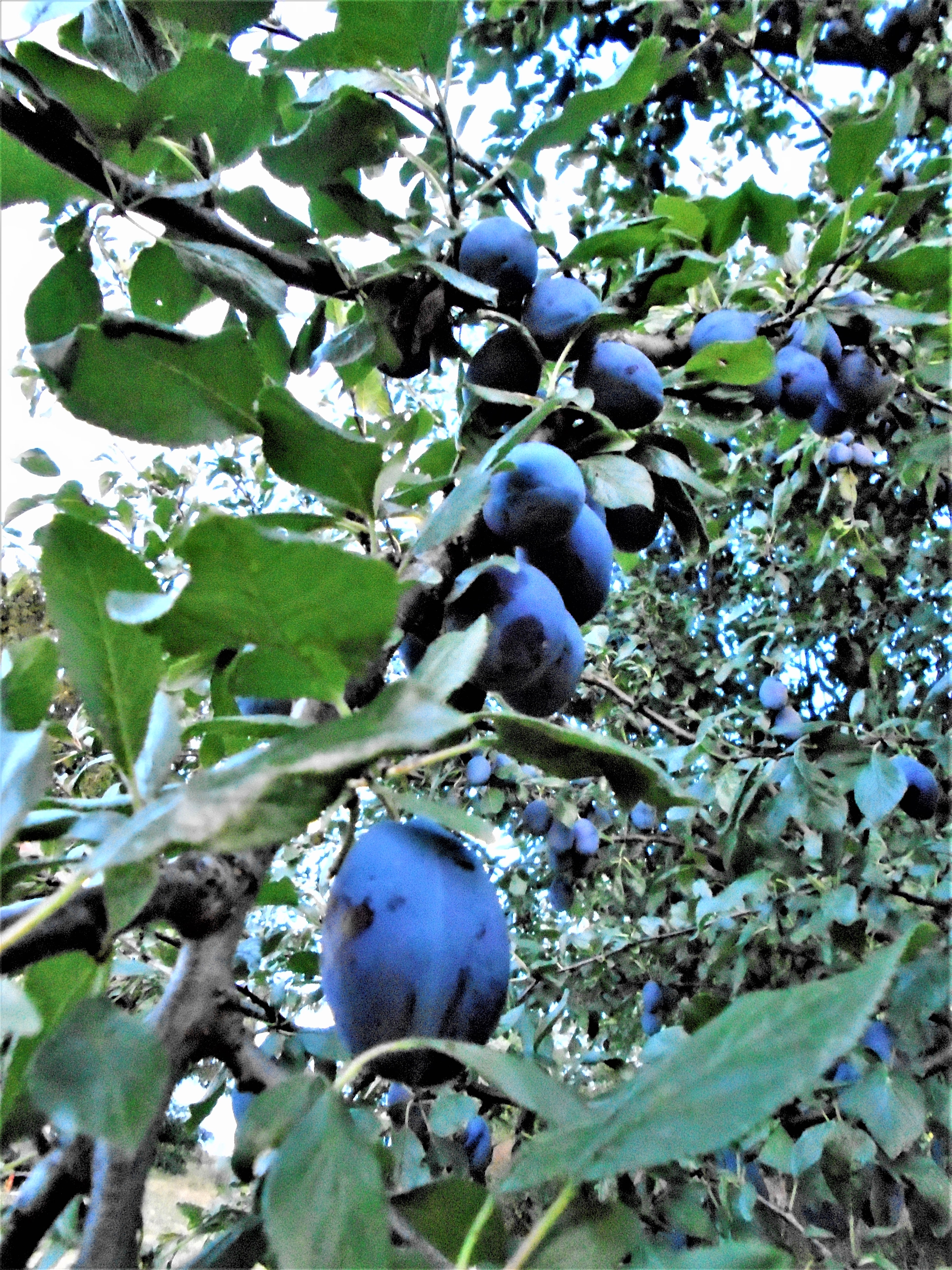
Stanley plum variety

== See also ==
- Cherry plum
- Fruit tree
- Fruit tree forms
- Fruit tree propagation
- Fruit tree pruning
- List of plum cultivars
- List of plum dishes
- Pluot
- Sugar plum
