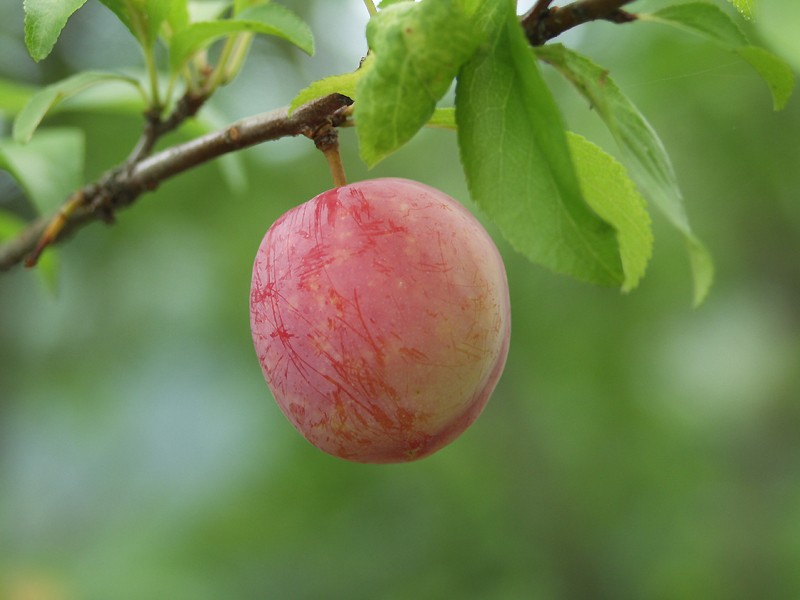

Conservation status
- Least Concern (IUCN 3.1)

Scientific classification
- Kingdom: Plantae
- Clade: Tracheophytes
- Clade: Angiosperms
- Clade: Eudicots
- Clade: Rosids
- Order: Rosales
- Family: Rosaceae
- Genus: Prunus
- Subgenus: Prunus subg. Prunus
- Section: Prunus sect. Prunus
- Species: P. salicina

Binomial name
- Prunus salicina Lindl.

Synonyms
- Cerasus salicina (Lindl.) Loudon; Cerasus triflora Wall.; Prunus triflora Roxb.; Prunus trifolia Roxb.; Prunus thibetica Franch.; Prunus armeniaca Blanco; Prunus botan André; Prunus ichangana C.K.Schneid.; Prunus masu Koehne; Prunus staminata Hand.-Mazz.; Prunus gymnodonta Koehne

= Prunus salicina =

Species of tree

Prunus salicina (syn. Prunus triflora or Prunus thibetica), commonly called the Chinese plum or Japanese plum, is a small, deciduous tree native to China, Taiwan, and Southeast Asia. It is an introduced species in Korea, Japan, the United States, and Australia.

Prunus salicina should not be confused with Prunus mume, a related species also commonly called Chinese plum; or the loquat, which is also known as the Japanese or Chinese plum. Prunus japonica is another tree that is a separate species despite having a Latin name similar to Prunus salicina's common name.

== Names ==
Some names for this plant, in addition to Japanese or Chinese plum, are willow-leaf cherry, Asian plum, in English, ameixa or ameixa-japonesa in Portuguese, 李 (lǐ) in Mandarin, and Japanskt plommon in Swedish.

The Latin generic name Prunus derives from the Ancient Greek προύνη (proúnē), meaning plum. The specific epithet, salicina, is derived from the Latin word for willow, since the leaves of Prunus salicina have a narrow, lanceolate, and taper-pointed shape, which is similar to the leaves of some willow species.

== Description ==
Prunus salicina grows up to 9–12 m (30–39 ft) tall, and its branches are purplish- to reddish-brown, and its lateral shoots are yellowish-red.

The leaves are 6–12 cm long and 2.5–5 cm broad, with scalloped margins, which when young are often mixed with simple, gland-tipped teeth. The leaves' shapes tend to be oblong, though they sometimes vary to slightly more obovate (broader above the middle), narrowly elliptic, or in rare cases slightly ovate (broader half below the middle). The base of the leaf is wedge-shaped, and its apex ranges from acute (pointed) to caudate (having a slender, short tail). The upper side of the leaf is dark green and lustrous, and has six or seven secondary veins on either side of midvein, not extending to the leaf margin.

The winter buds of P. salicina are purplish red and are rarely hairy at scale margins. The flowers are produced in early spring, around April, each about 2 cm in diameter with five white petals, and they grow in groups of three. The pedicel is 1.0–1.5 cm, and its sepals are oblong-ovate and about 5 mm, hairless on the outside, with loosely serrated margins. The sepal's apex is acute to obtuse. The petals of the flower are white and oblong-obovate, with a wedge-shaped base and a jagged margin near the apex. The ovary is hairless and the stigma is disc-shaped.

The fruit is a drupe, 4–7 cm in diameter, with yellow-pink flesh, The skin can be yellow, red, or sometimes green or purple, and has a powdery coating. The shape of the drupe is spherical, egg-shaped, or conical, and it is 3.5–5 cm in diameter, though it can reach 7 cm in diameter in horticultural forms. The trees fruit from July to August. When fully ripe, fruit can be eaten raw. In comparison to P. domestica, P. salicina, fruit has a higher flavor and aroma, better texture, more color, bigger size, and good nutritional values.

The pit of P. salicina is ovoid to oblong and wrinkled.

=== Growth pattern ===
The Japanese plum, like other Prunus species, is mostly self-incompatible, so requires cross pollination to ensure fruit set because this genus is unable to bear fruit parthenocarpically. Several cultivars or varieties, however, have been found to be self-compatible.

== Distribution and habitat ==
P. salicina is native to China, Taiwan, Myanmar, Laos, and Vietnam. In China, it grows in sparse forests, forest margins, thickets, along trails in mountains, and stream sides in valleys, at elevations of 200–2600 m. It grows best in temperate warmer regions, as it requires moderate temperatures and is usually early flowering.

The domestication center of origin of P. salicina is southwestern China, from the Yangtze River Basin. Wild populations of this species are reported as thriving in the provinces of Shaanxi and Gansu. It is recorded as an introduced species in both Australia and Japan.

== Ecology ==
P. salicina is strongly dependent on endomycorrhizal relationships, similar to other species of plums. Ectomycorrhizal relationships with the fungus Hebeloma hiemale was shown to increase net growth in P. cerasifera x salicina, compared to chemical fertilizer, compost, and a control.

The effects of the P. salicina in improving soil in karst areas in China have been mixed. A study conducted in Guiyang Karst Park, Guizhou, China, concluded that P. salicina, in combination with the moss species, Homomallium plagiangium, Cyrto-hypnum pygmaeuman, and Brachythecium perminusculum, and the herbs Veronica arvensis and Youngia japonica, were suitable pioneer plant species to cultivate for use in restoration of regions of karstic soil erosion. Planted on cropland suffering from rocky desertification, in the city of Hechi, P. salicina increased the carbon-to-nitrogen ratio and the soil quality at the 10–20 cm soil layer, though in general, it had limited influence on soil improvement because of its fast growth and high output, increasing the absorption of nutrients from the soil.

== Cultivation ==
The main producing country of Japanese plums is China, followed by the United States of America, Mexico, Italy, Spain, Pakistan, Korea, Australia, Chile, France, South Africa, and Argentina. The most famous variety of this fruit in Vietnam is the Tam Hoa plum grown in Bắc Hà town, in Lào Cai Province.

Japanese cultivars were introduced into the United States in the latter half of the 19th century, where subsequent breeding produced many more cultivars, generally with larger fruit. Plant breeder Luther Burbank developed a number of cultivars by hybridizing P. salicina with P. simonii and other native North American diploid plums such as P. americana, P. hortulana, or P. munsoniana. In the late 19th and early 20th centuries from these hybridizations, Burbank selected cultivars such as 'Beauty', 'Eldorado', 'Formosa', 'Gaviota', 'Santa Rosa', 'Shiro', and 'Wickson', some of which are still widely grown. One of the famous cultivars, "Santa Rosa", named after the city in California.

Most of the fresh plums sold in North American supermarkets are P. salicina cultivars or hybrids. They are grown on a large scale in a number of other countries, for example, they dominate the stone fruit industry in Western Australia. In France in 2020, Japanese plum production volumes are now higher than those of European plums.

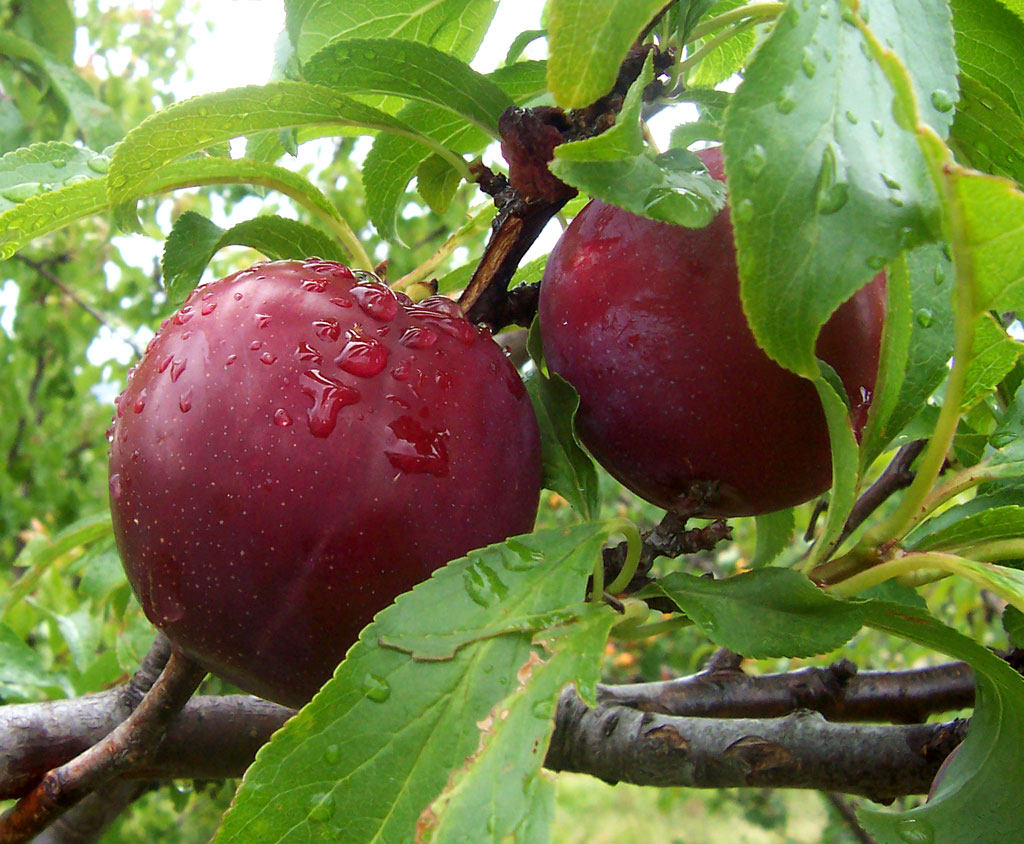

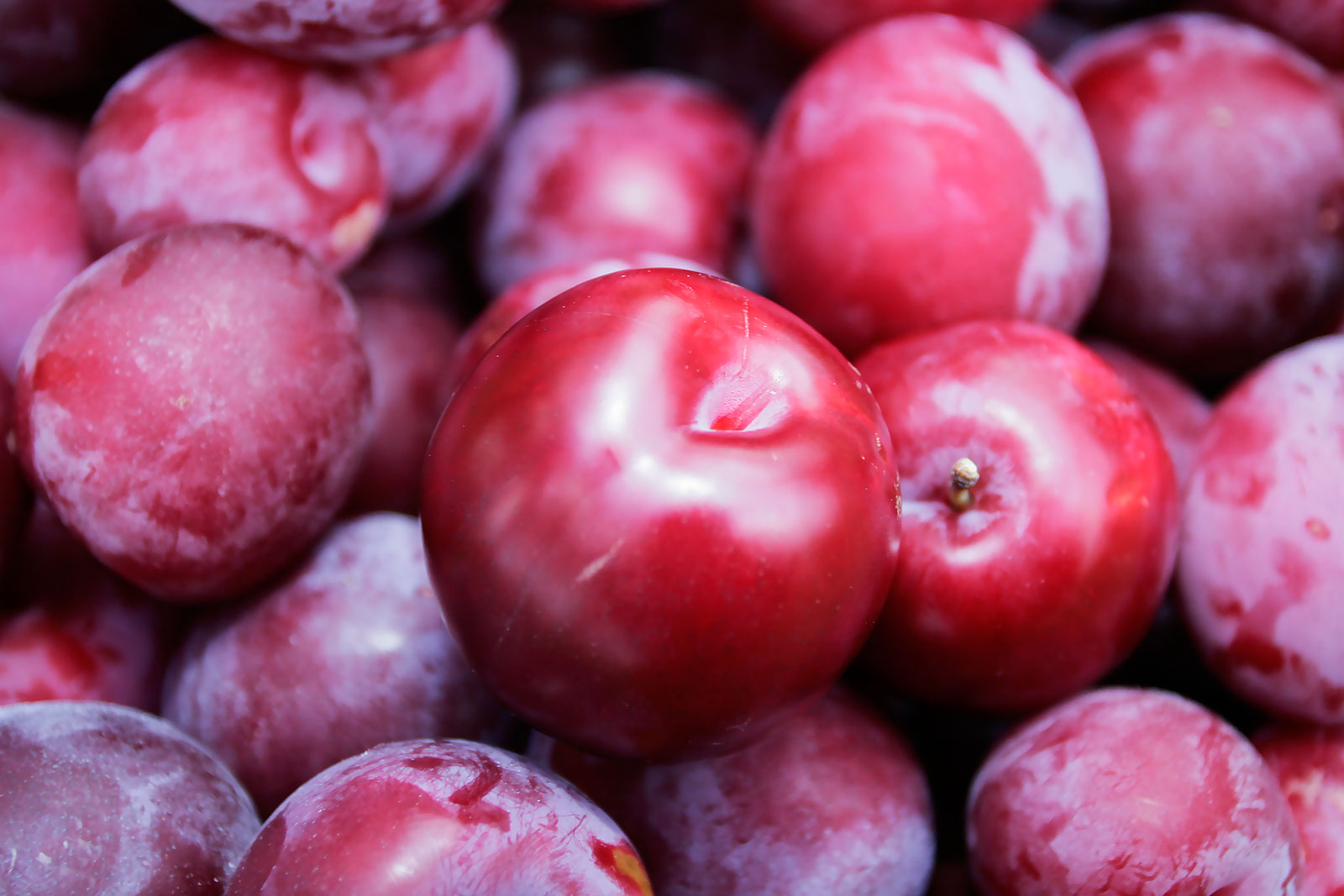

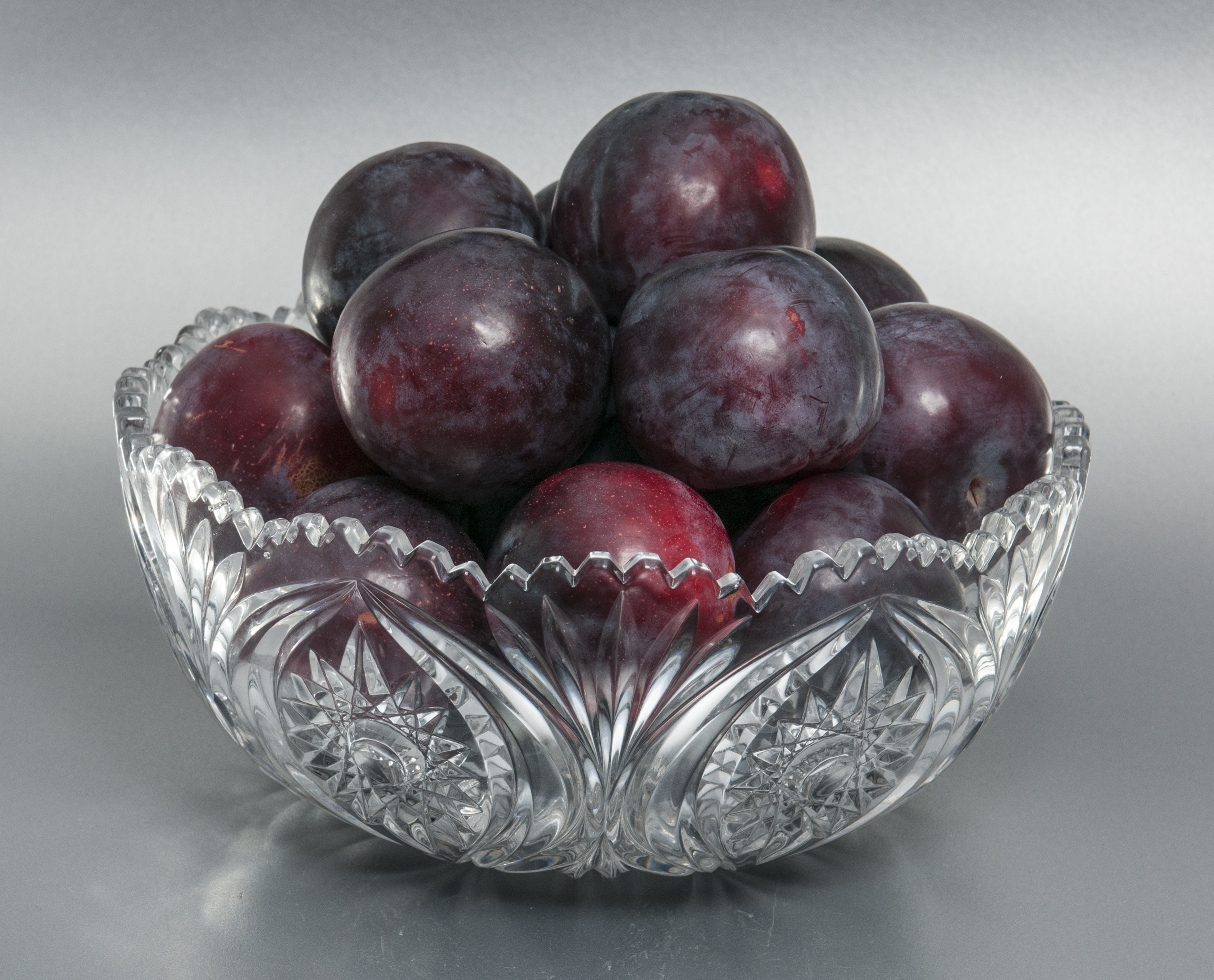

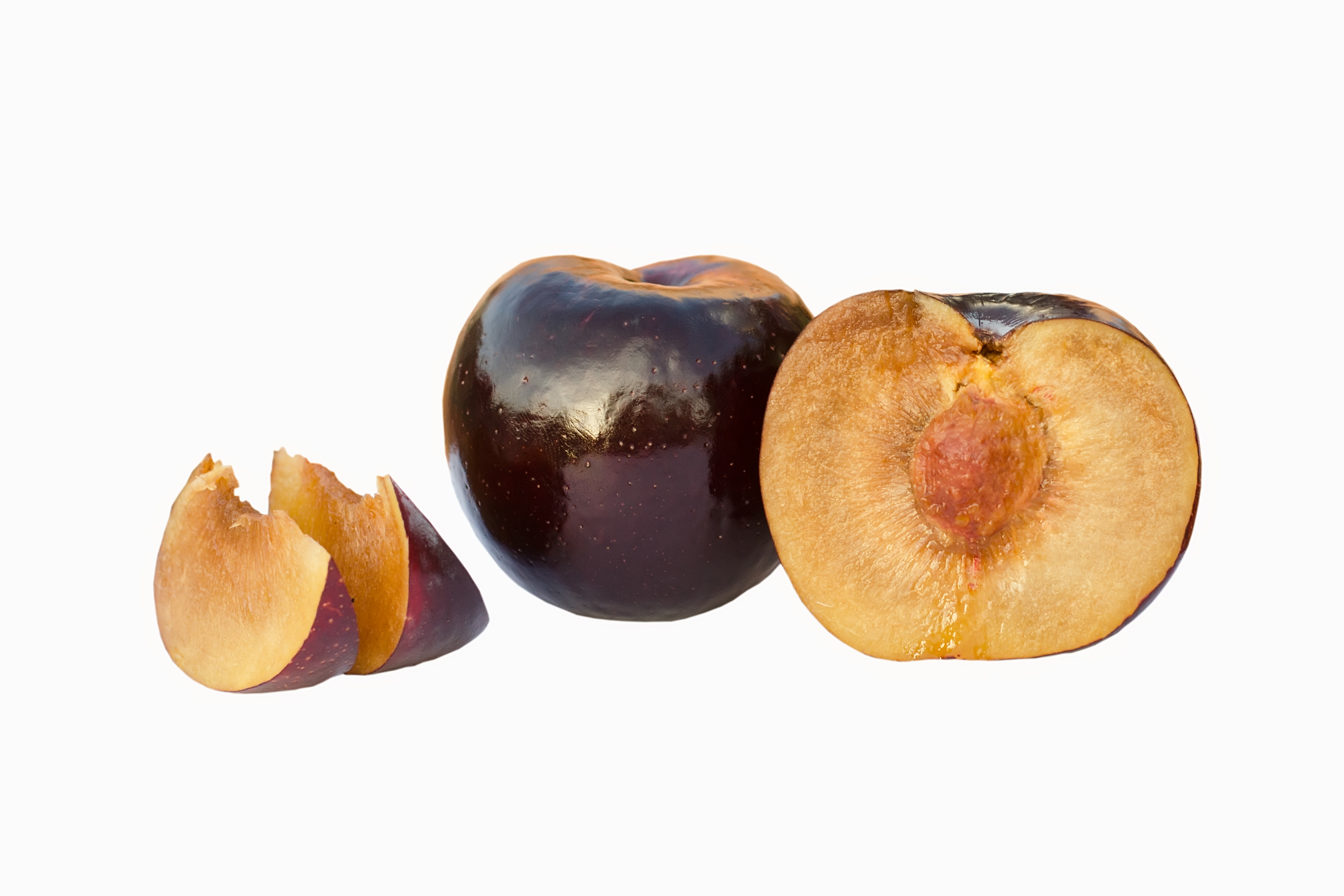
Black Amber plum

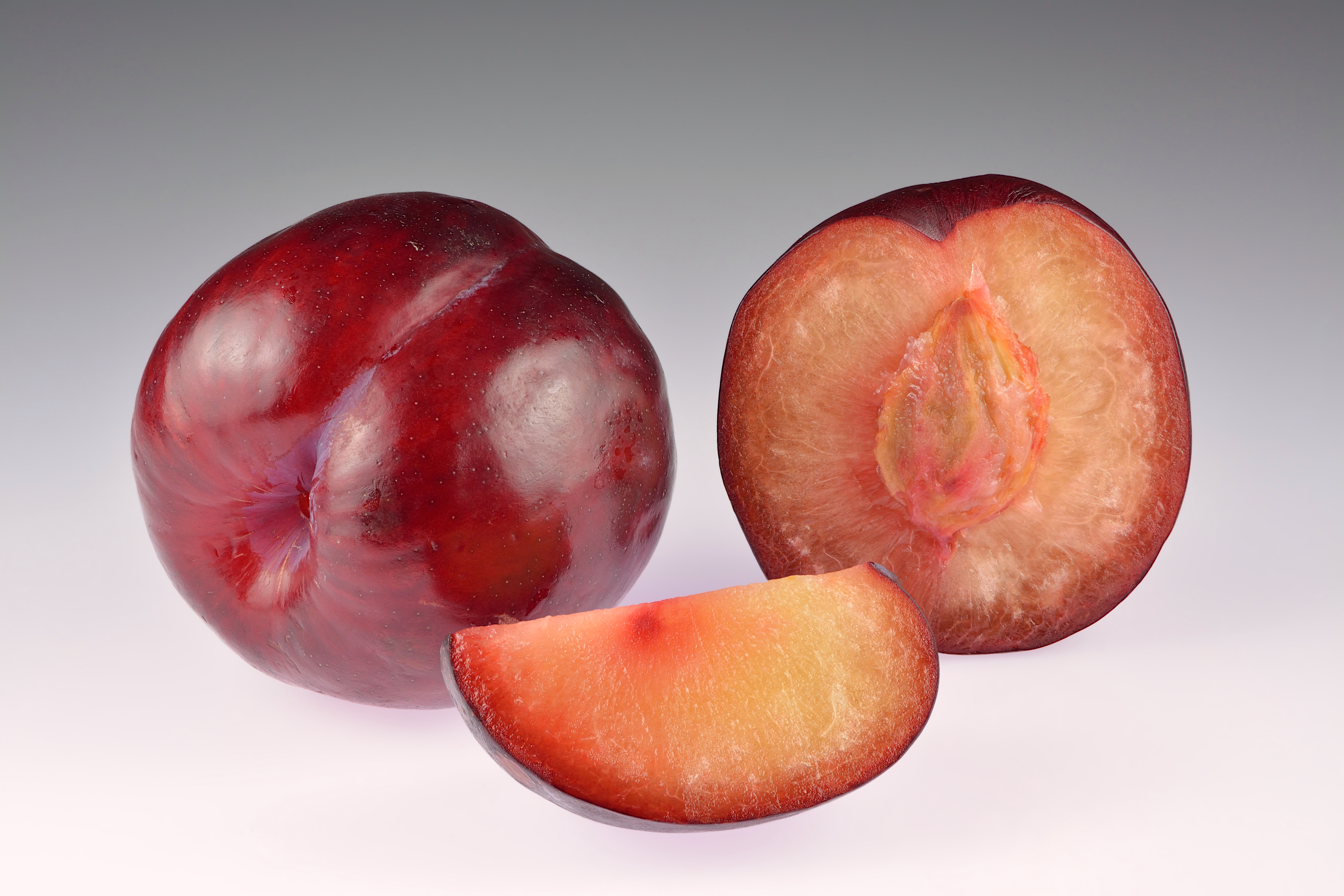
Africa Rose plum

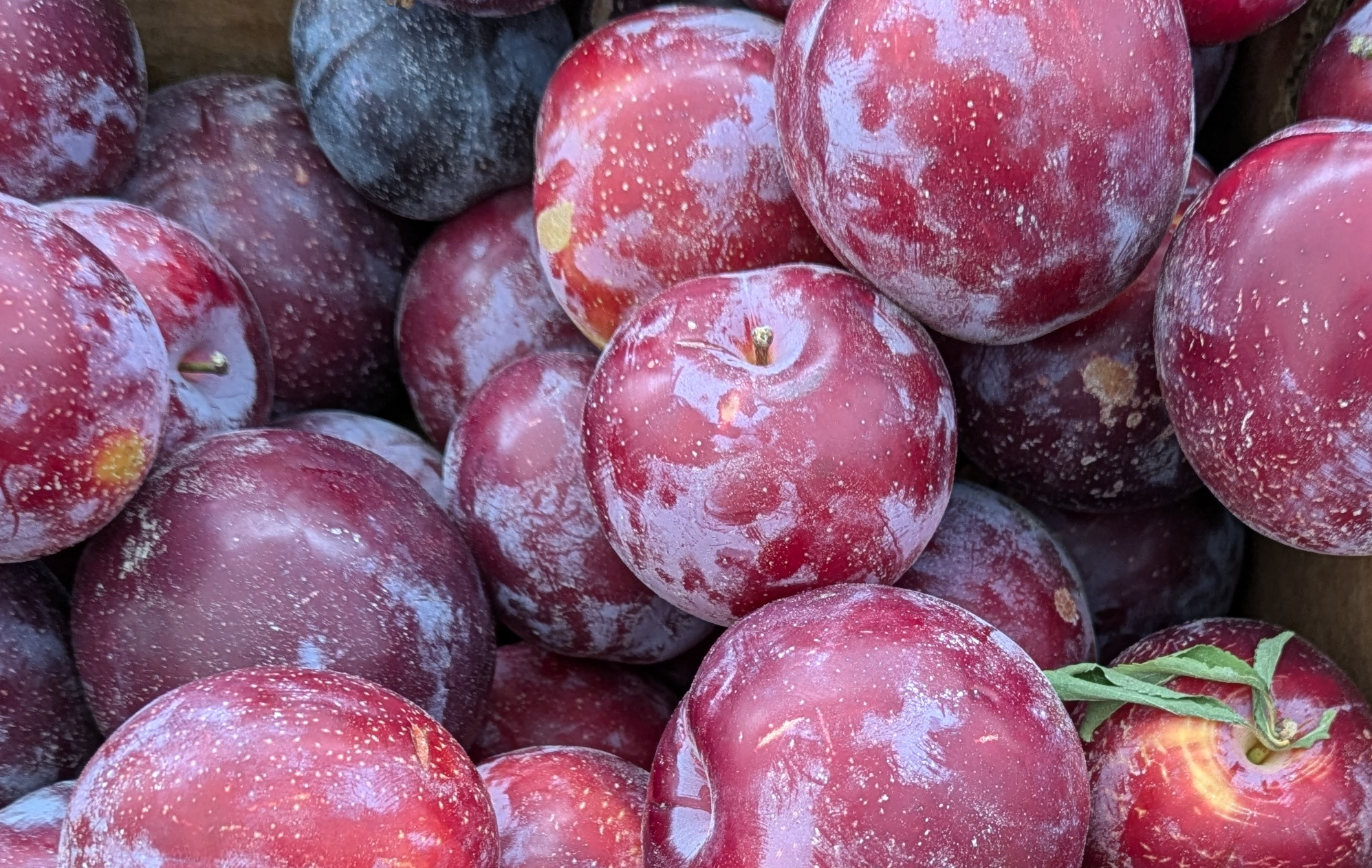
Santa Rosa plums

The important work of breeding and selection of new Japanese plum cultivars and varieties is continuing around the world from different breeding programs. As a result, the Community Plant Variety Office of the European Union (CPVO) registered 155 new Japanese plum cultivars from 1995 to 2021. The table below presents a short list of varieties.

Cultivars	Description
'Bubblegum'/"Toka"	This cultivar is disease-resistant and is known to be a reliable pollinator. It is a hybrid between P. americana and P. salicina. Its fruit is very juicy and sweet, and the skin is reddish bronze.
'Burbank'	This cultivar starts to bear fruit in 2–3 years. It needs cross-pollination from different Japanese plum cultivars. It can be used as a landscape flowering tree in spring or a shade tree in summer. It grows 13–24 inches per year.
'Byrongold'	This cultivar produces a large quantity of fruit. It has problems with leaf scald and a chilling requirement of 450 units. It needs two cultivars planted to improve fruiting.
'Early Golden'	This cultivar bears round, golden, firm, freestone plums with high red blush. While not as large as 'Shiro', the cultivar ripens 10–14 days earlier. Trees are very vigorous, outgrowing other plum cultivars. It has a biennial fruiting habit, but can be eliminated with proper thinning and irrigation.
'Golden Japan'	This cultivar's fruit is medium-sized, rounded, golden yellow, sometimes with pink to scarlet red dots or small cheeks when fully ripe on the tree. The taste is very sweet, and the flesh is pale yellow and juicy, and clingstone. It has thick skin.
'Methley'	This cultivar is a heavy bearing variety that starts to produce fruit in two to four growing seasons. The early blossom is easily susceptible to spring frost damage. It is self-fertile, but planting two cultivars is recommended and is heat tolerant.
'Santa Rosa'	The Santa Rosa cultivar produces white spring blooms and is commonly eaten fresh, canned, or cooked. The plums are large in size with red to purple coloring, ripening midseason.
'Shiro'	The 'Shiro' cultivar produces medium-sized fruit with yellow skin and flesh, and it grows in warm, sheltered sites only. The white, early spring blossoms are prone to frost damage, so protection is usually needed.
'Ozark Premier'	This plum is a cross between 'Methley' and 'Burbank'. It is self-fruitful, but planting two different cultivars is recommended to improve fruiting. Certain chilling hours are required.
'Vampire'	This cultivar bears medium-large fruits, late midseason. It has a blend of shiny green and ruby red skin. The flesh is red and very juicy. It is cold-tolerant
'Vanier'	This cultivar bears medium-sized, bright red, clingstone fruits with yellow flesh, maturing 2 weeks later than 'Shiro'. Fruit can be stored for 2–3 weeks. Trees are precocious and vigorous, and have an upright growth habit.

== Threats ==
In open-field cultivation, this species is vulnerable to several vector- or pollen-borne viral diseases affecting Prunus species, including plum pox virus and Prunus necrotic ringspot virus. Japanese plums are also well-known for their susceptibility to European stone-fruit yellows phytoplasma, with strong symptoms including yellowing, leaf roll, premature fruit drop, and dieback. Additional threats to this species remain unknown, and while several known threats to the forests of China exist, including logging, deforestation, and air and water pollution, whether these have a direct effect on P. salicina is unknown. As of 2023, its threat status on the IUCN Red List is least concern, and this species' population is stable. The IUCN Red List recommends "the incorporation of population management and monitoring in protected areas where this species is known to occur" and "additional ex situ collection, ensuring the full range of genetic diversity found in the wild is represented in gene banks."

== Uses ==
=== Culinary ===
Since P. salicina fruit has a short shelf-life (3–4 days) under room temperature, as well as cold storage (1–2 weeks), it is often prepared into jams, jellies, wine, and other beverages. Black pepper, coriander, cumin, clove, black cardamom, saffron, nutmeg, cinnamon, poppy seed, ginger, woodfordia, asparagus, withania, adhatoda, and rosemary have been reported to be used in preparing aromatized plum wine. The 'Santa Rosa' plum cultivar produces the best-quality wine, in comparison 'Methley', and 'Green Gage'.

In China, candied fruits are also sold preserved, flavoured with sugar, salt, and liquorice. A study on foraging in the Gongba Valley (Zhouqu County in Gansu, China) identified P. salicina as one of the most commonly eaten wild fruits. Liquor made from P. salicina fruit is mixed with P. mume liquor, and oolong tea liquor to make a Japanese-style plum liquor, wumeijiu (smoked plum liquor), in Taiwan.

In Japan, while it is less commonly eaten than closely related P. mume, it is pickled and colored in a similar manner. Especially in eastern Japan, many summer festivals sell pickled fruits covered in mizuame candy called anzuame (apricot candy, as apricots were traditionally used for the recipe).

In both countries, it is also used half-ripe as a flavouring in a liqueur called sumomo shu (すもも酒) in Japanese.

Nutritional value
	Range among cultivars of P. salicina
Water	80.65–89.40%
Fibre	<1.5%
Proteins	0.38–0.96%
Ash	<0.5%
Carbohydrate	10–17%
Glucose	4.41–10.27%
Fructose	1.82–4.79%
Sucrose	0.65–4.16%
Energy	183.04–331.10 kJ /100 g
Phenolic compounds	94.54–202.46 mg /100 g
Anthocyanins	<24.30 mg /100 g
Total antioxident activity	258.6–946.52 mg Trolox /100 g

=== Medicinal ===
The fruits are also used in traditional Chinese medicine to enhance immunity against infectious agents and treat cancers. Japanese plums 'Crimson Globe' may be taken as a source of antioxidants with a potential to counteract oxidation. Prunus salicina fruit may contain immunostimulatory (stimulating the immune system by inducing activation or increasing activity) components that potentially may be useful in human and veterinary medicine. Compared to other fruits, Japanese plums include a reasonable source of fiber and proper source of bioactive compounds (such as vitamin C and phenolic composition). Their phenolic composition positively correlates to their antioxidant properties. A study evaluating ethanol extracts from 400 herbs found that the Japanese plum was the most effective glucosyltransferase (GTF) inhibitor and showed the highest antibacterial activity. Research has been conducted into whether the fruit of the Japanese plum has cancer-protective effects because of its antioxidant properties, but as of 2023, the role antioxidants in general and in cancer protection and treatment is unclear.

== Toxicity ==
As with other stone fruits, the pit and leaves are poisonous to humans, as they contain amygdalin, which breaks down to hydrogen cyanide. While poisoning from unintentional ingestion of a few pits is unlikely, avoiding ingestion, especially of crushed pits, is recommended.
