= Foals discography =

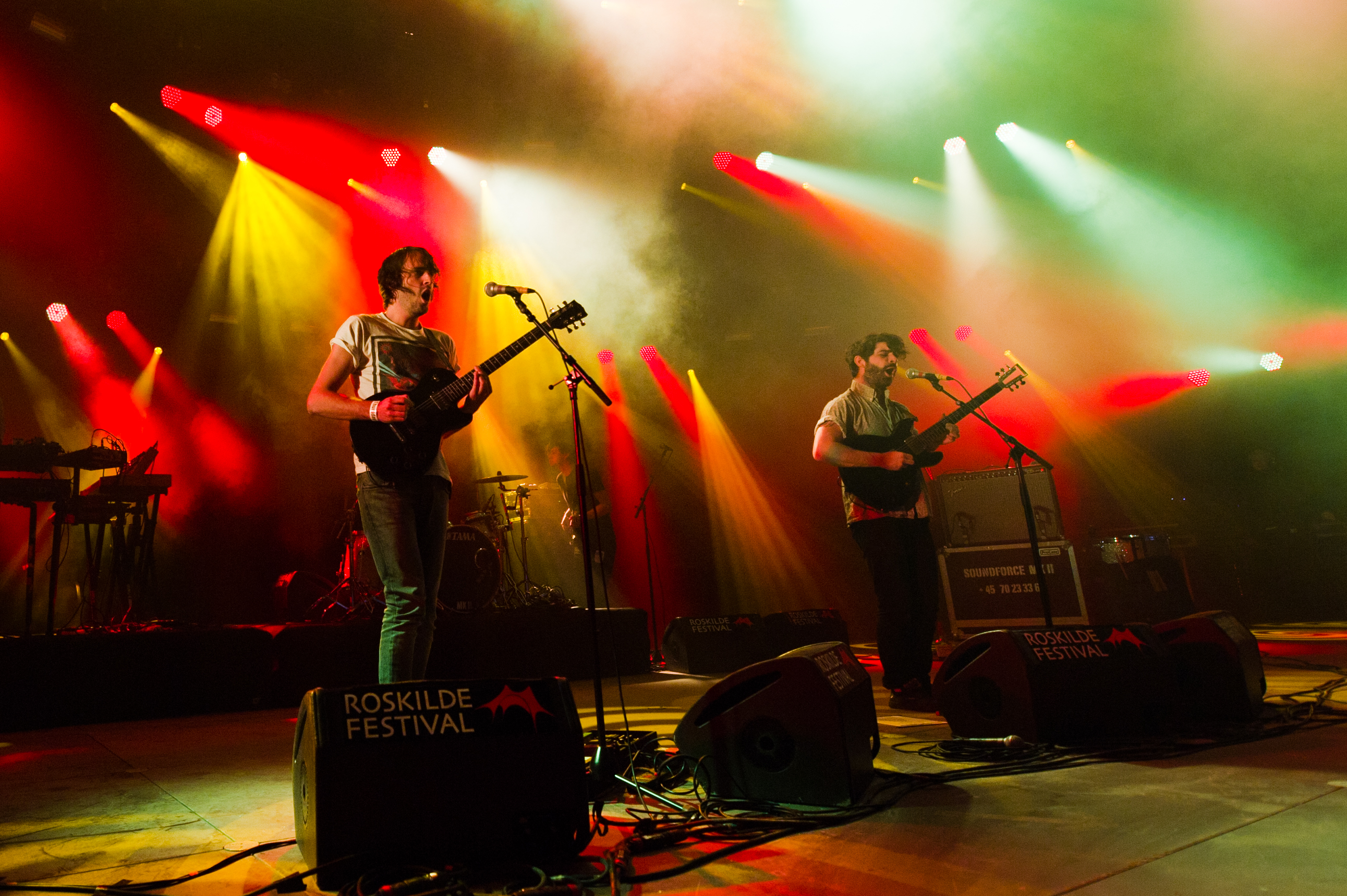
- Foals performing at Roskilde Festival 2011.
- Studio albums: 7
- EPs: 7
- Singles: 28
- Video albums: 1
- Music videos: 37

British alternative rock band Foals has released seven studio albums, one video album, six extended plays, thirty-three singles and thirty-seven music videos.

== Albums ==
=== Studio albums ===
Title	Details	Peak chart positions										Sales	Certifications (sales thresholds)
Title	Details	UK	AUS	BEL (FL)	FRA	GER	IRE	NL	NZ	SWI	US	Sales	Certifications (sales thresholds)
Antidotes	Released: 24 March 2008; Label: Transgressive, Sub Pop; Formats: CD, digital download, LP	3	— (Note: Antidotes did not enter the Australian ARIA Albums Chart but peaked at number 15 on the ARIA Hitseekers Chart.)	—	84	—	20	99	—	—	— (Note: Antidotes did not enter the US Billboard 200, but peaked at number 28 on the US Heatseekers Albums Chart.)	US: 36,000	BPI: Gold
Total Life Forever	Released: 10 May 2010; Label: Transgressive, Sub Pop; Formats: CD, digital download, LP	8	68	83	38	48	25	— (Note: Total Life Forever did not enter the Dutch Album Top 100, but peaked at number 18 on the Dutch Alternative Albums chart.)	—	62	— (Note: Total Life Forever did not enter the US Billboard 200, but peaked at number 30 on the US Heatseekers Albums Chart.)	US: 25,000	BPI: Gold
Holy Fire	Released: 11 February 2013; Label: Transgressive, Sub Pop; Formats: CD, digital download, LP	2	1	25	22	31	7	41	15	15	86	UK: 190,075; US: 41,000	BPI: Gold; RMNZ: Gold
What Went Down	Released: 28 August 2015; Label: Transgressive, Sub Pop; Formats: CD, digital download, LP	3	3	17	14	26	5	4	5	9	58	UK: 143,304	BPI: Gold; RMNZ: Gold
Everything Not Saved Will Be Lost – Part 1	Released: 8 March 2019; Label: Transgressive, Warner Bros.; Formats: CD, digital download, LP, streaming	2	11	17	17	15	10	22	35	15	58	UK: 51,712	BPI: Gold
Everything Not Saved Will Be Lost – Part 2	Released: 18 October 2019; Label: Transgressive, Warner; Formats: CD, digital download, LP, streaming	1	10	56	40	23	15	40	39	21	— (Note: Everything Not Saved Will Be Lost – Part 2 did not enter the US Billboard 200, but peaked at number 22 on the US Billboard Digital Albums Chart.)		BPI: Silver
Life Is Yours	Released: 17 June 2022; Label: Warner, ADA; Formats: CD, digital download, LP, streaming	3	13	61	42	13	15	34	35	10	— (Note: Life IS Yours did not enter the US Billboard 200, but peaked at number 47 on the US Billboard Current Album Sales Chart.)		
"—" denotes album that did not chart or was not released

=== Remix albums ===
Title	Details	Peak chart positions			
Title	Details	UK	UK Dance	GER	SCO
Everything Not Saved Will Be Lost Part 1 (Remixes)	Released: 16 September 2019; Studio: Warner Bros.; Format: Digital download	—	—	—	—
Collected Reworks Vol. 1	Released: 12 June 2020; Studio: Warner Bros.; Format: Digital download	— (Note: "Collected Reworks Vol. 1" did not enter the UK Singles Chart, but peaked at number 50 on the UK Albums Downloads Chart.)	6	—	—
Collected Reworks Vol. 1, 2 & 3	Released: 9 October 2020; Studio: Warner Bros.; Format: LP	54	3	84	25
Life Is Dub	Released: 22 April 2023; Studio: Warner Bros.; Format: Digital download, LP	— (Note: "Collected Reworks Vol. 1" did not enter the UK Singles Chart, but peaked at number 55 on the UK Albums Sales Chart.)	16	—	57
"—" denotes album that did not chart or was not released

=== Video albums ===
Title	Details	Peak chart positions
Title	Details	UK Video
Live at the Royal Albert Hall	Released: 28 October 2013; Studio: Warner Bros.; Format: DVD, Blu-ray, LP	16

== Extended plays ==
Title	Details	Peak chart positions
Title	Details	UK Sales
Live at Liars Club	Released: 19 March 2007; Label: Transgressive; Format: LP	—
iTunes Live: London Festival '08	Released: 11 July 2008; Label: Transgressive, Warner Bros.; Format: Digital download	—
Gold Gold Gold	Released: 9 September 2008; Label: Sub Pop; Format: Digital download	—
UK B-sides	Released: 2008; Label: Sub Pop; Format: CD	—
iTunes Festival: London 2010	Released: 8 July 2010; Label: Warner Bros.; Format: Digital download	—
Metropolis Session	Released: 6 December 2010; Label: Transgressive, Warner Bros.; Format: LP	30
"—" denotes album that did not chart or was not released

== Singles ==
List of singles, with year released, selected chart positions, certifications, and album name shown
Title	Year	Peak chart positions										Certifications	Album
Title	Year	UK	AUS	BEL (FL)	FRA	IRE	JPN	MEX	NL	SCO	US Rock	Certifications	Album
"Try This on Your Piano" / "Look at My Furrows of Worry"	2006	—	—	—	—	—	—	—	—	—	—		Non-album singles
"Hummer" (Note: Hummer was originally released as a non-album single, but was later added as a bonus track on the album Antidotes.)	2007	167	—	—	—	—	—	—	—	—	—		Non-album singles
"Mathletics" (Note: Mathletics was originally released as a non-album single, but was later added as a bonus track on the album Antidotes.)	2007	109	—	—	—	—	—	—	—	55	—		Non-album singles
"Balloons"	2007	39	—	—	—	—	—	—	—	18	—		Antidotes
"Cassius"	2008	26	—	—	—	—	—	—	—	6	—		Antidotes
"Red Socks Pugie"	2008	89	—	—	—	—	—	—	—	27	—		Antidotes
"Olympic Airways"	2008	160	—	—	—	—	—	—	—	20	—		Antidotes
"Spanish Sahara"	2010	123	—	—	—	—	—	—	—	—	—	BPI: Silver	Total Life Forever
"This Orient"	2010	97	—	—	—	—	71	— (Note: "This Orient" did not enter the Mexico Airplay chart, but peaked at number 18 on the Mexico Ingles Airplay chart.)	—	98	—		Total Life Forever
"Miami"	2010	127	—	—	—	—	—	— (Note: "Miami" did not enter the Mexico Airplay chart, but peaked at number 21 on the Mexico Ingles Airplay chart.)	—	—	—		Total Life Forever
"Blue Blood"	2010	—	—	—	—	—	—	— (Note: "Blue Blood" did not enter the Mexico Airplay chart, but peaked at number 14 on the Mexico Ingles Airplay chart.)	—	—	—		Total Life Forever
"Inhaler"	2012	90	—	—	—	—	62	— (Note: "Inhaler" did not enter the Mexico Airplay chart, but peaked at number 31 on the Mexico Ingles Airplay chart.)	—	—	— (Note: "Inhaler" did not enter the Hot Rock & Alternative Songs chart, but peaked at number 33 on the US Rock & Alternative Airplay chart.)		Holy Fire
"My Number"	2012	23	98	45	38	51	—	— (Note: "My Number" did not enter the Mexico Airplay chart, but peaked at number 29 on the Mexico Ingles Airplay chart.)	83	25	— (Note: "My Number" did not enter the Hot Rock & Alternative Songs chart, but peaked at number 48 on the US Rock & Alternative Airplay chart.)	BPI: 2× Platinum	Holy Fire
"Late Night"	2013	146	—	—	—	—	—	— (Note: "Late Night" did not enter the Mexico Airplay chart, but peaked at number 35 on the Mexico Ingles Airplay chart.)	—	—	—	BPI: Silver	Holy Fire
"Bad Habit"	2013	— (Note: "Bad Habit" did not enter the UK Singles Chart, but peaked at number 50 on the UK Streaming Chart.)	—	— (Note: "Bad Habit" did not enter the Flanders Ultratop 50, but peaked at number 89 on the Ultratip chart.)	—	—	—	— (Note: "Bad Habit" did not enter the Mexico Airplay chart, but peaked at number 41 on the Mexico Ingles Airplay chart.)	—	—	—		Holy Fire
"Out of the Woods"	2013	— (Note: "Out of the Woods" did not enter the UK Singles Chart, but peaked at number 80 on the UK Streaming Chart.)	—	— (Note: "Out of the Woods" did not enter the Flanders Ultratop 50, but peaked at number 23 on the Ultratip chart.)	—	—	—	— (Note: "Out of the Woods" did not enter the Mexico Airplay chart, but peaked at number 35 on the Mexico Ingles Airplay chart.)	—	—	—		Holy Fire
"What Went Down"	2015	172	—	—	—	—	—	— (Note: "What Went Down" did not enter the Mexico Airplay chart, but peaked at number 30 on the Mexico Ingles Airplay chart.)	—	—	— (Note: "What Went Down" did not enter the Hot Rock & Alternative Songs chart, but peaked at number 24 on the US Alternative Airplay chart.)	BPI: Silver	What Went Down
"Mountain at My Gates"	2015	87	— (Note: "Mountain at My Gates" did not enter the Australian ARIA Singles Chart but peaked at number eight on the ARIA Hitseekers Chart.)	— (Note: "Mountain at My Gates" did not enter the Flanders Ultratop 50, but peaked at number 35 on the Ultratip chart.)	192	—	—	— (Note: "Mountain at My Gates" did not enter the Mexico Airplay chart, but peaked at number 48 on the Mexico Ingles Airplay chart.)	—	—	18	BPI: Platinum; RIAA: Gold	What Went Down
"Give It All"	2015	—	—	— (Note: "Give It All" did not enter the Flanders Ultratop 50, but peaked at number 52 on the Ultratip chart.)	—	—	—	—	—	—	—		What Went Down
"Birch Tree"	2016	—	—	— (Note: "Birch Tree" did not enter the Flanders Ultratop Top 50, but charted as an extra tip on the Ultratop Bubbling Under chart.)	—	—	—	—	—	—	—	BPI: Silver	What Went Down
"Rain"	2016	— (Note: "Rain" did not enter the UK Singles Chart, but peaked at number 4 on the UK Physical Singles Chart.)	—	—	—	—	—	—	—	—	—		Non-album single
"Exits"	2019	70	—	— (Note: "Exits" did not enter the Flanders Ultratop 50, but peaked at number 36 on the Ultratip chart.)	—	—	—	—	—	—	— (Note: "Exits" did not enter the Hot Rock & Alternative Songs chart, but peaked at number 34 on the US Rock & Alternative Airplay chart.)		Everything Not Saved Will Be Lost – Part 1
"On the Luna"	2019	—	—	— (Note: "On the Luna" did not enter the Flanders Ultratop 50, but peaked at number 40 on the Ultratip chart.)	—	—	—	—	—	—	—		Everything Not Saved Will Be Lost – Part 1
"Sunday"	2019	—	—	—	—	—	—	—	—	—	—		Everything Not Saved Will Be Lost – Part 1
"In Degrees"	2019	82	—	— (Note: "In Degrees" did not enter the Flanders Ultratop Top 50, but charted as an extra tip on the Ultratop Bubbling Under chart.)	—	—	—	36	—	—	—		Everything Not Saved Will Be Lost – Part 1
"Black Bull"	2019	—	—	— (Note: "Black Bull" did not enter the Flanders Ultratop Top 50, but charted as an extra tip on the Ultratop Bubbling Under chart.)	—	—	—	—	—	—	—		Everything Not Saved Will Be Lost – Part 2
"The Runner"	2019	87	—	— (Note: "The Runner" did not enter the Flanders Ultratop 50, but peaked at number 35 on the Ultratip chart.)	—	—	—	—	—	79	— (Note: "The Runner" did not enter the Hot Rock & Alternative Songs chart, but peaked at number 32 on the US Alternative Airplay chart.)	BPI: Silver	Everything Not Saved Will Be Lost – Part 2
"Into the Surf"	2019	—	—	—	—	—	—	—	—	—	—		Everything Not Saved Will Be Lost – Part 2
"Like Lightning"	2019	—	—	—	—	—	—	—	—	—	—		Everything Not Saved Will Be Lost – Part 2
"Neptune"	2020	—	—	—	—	—	—	—	—	—	—		Everything Not Saved Will Be Lost – Part 2
"Hypercolour" (with CamelPhat) (Note: "Hypercolour" is officially credited as by "Yannis of Foals".)	2020	77	—	— (Note: "Hypercolour" did not enter the Flanders Ultratop 50, but peaked at number 15 on the Ultratip chart.)	—	—	—	—	—	39	—		Dark Matter
"Wake Me Up"	2021	98	—	—	—	—	—	— (Note: "Wake Me Up" did not enter the Mexico Airplay chart, but peaked at number 24 on the Mexico Ingles Airplay chart.)	—	×	— (Note: "Wake Me Up" did not enter the Hot Rock & Alternative Songs chart, but peaked at number 21 on the US Rock & Alternative Airplay chart.)		Life Is Yours
"2am"	2022	— (Note: "2am" did not enter the UK Singles Chart, but peaked at number 97 on the UK Singles Sales Chart.)	—	—	—	—	—	—	—	×	— (Note: "2am" did not enter the Hot Rock & Alternative Songs chart, but peaked at number 37 on the US Alternative Airplay chart.)		Life Is Yours
"Looking High"	2022	—	—	—	—	—	—	—	—	×	—		Life Is Yours
"2001"	2022	—	—	—	—	—	—	—	—	×	—		Life Is Yours
"Crest of the Wave"	2022	—	—	—	—	—	—	—	—	×	—		Life Is Yours
"—" denotes single that did not chart or was not released. "×" denotes periods where charts did not exist or were not archived.

== Other charted songs ==
Title	Year	Peak chart positions		Album
Title	Year	UK Stream	BEL (FL)	Album
"Prelude"	2013	62	—	Holy Fire
"Everytime"	2013	57	—	Holy Fire
"Milk & Black Spiders"	2013	81	—	Holy Fire
"Providence"	2013	98	—	Holy Fire
"Wash Off"	2019	—	— (Note: "Wash Off" did not enter the Flanders Ultratop Top 50, but charted as an extra tip on the Ultratop Bubbling Under chart.)	Everything Not Saved Will Be Lost – Part 2
"—" denotes single that did not chart or was not released

== Remixes ==
Title	Year	Artist(s)
"The More That I Do" (Foals XIII Remix)	2009	The Field
"Fast Challenges" (Edwin Foals Remix)	2011	Chad Valley
"Everything We Touch" (Yannis Remix)	2014	Say Lou Lou
"Palace" (Foals Remix)	2014	Wild Beasts
"Heartbeats" (Edwin Foals Remix)	2015	JAGAARA
"No Need To Be So Small" (Edwin Foals Remix)	2015	Antimatter People
"Dark Days" featuring Sylvan Esso (Foals Remix)	2020	Local Natives
"Big Climb" (Jack Foals Grouse Party Remix)	2021	Everything Everything
"This Is Why" (Re: Foals)	2023	Paramore

== Music videos ==
Title	Year	Director(s)
"Hummer"	2007	Ollie Evans
"Mathletics"	2007	Ben Rollason
"Balloons"	2007	Dave Ma
"Cassius"	2008	Dave Ma
"Red Socks Pugie"	2008	Dave Ma
"Olympic Airways"	2009	Dave Ma
"Spanish Sahara"	2010	Dave Ma
"This Orient"	2010	Dave Ma
"Miami"	2010	Dave Ma
"2 Trees"	2010	Adam Bizanski
"Blue Blood"	2010	Chris Sweeney
"Inhaler"	2012	Dave Ma
"My Number"	2013	Dave Ma
"Late Night"	2013	NABIL
"Bad Habit"	2013	NABIL
"Out Of The Woods"	2013	NABIL
"What Went Down"	2015	Niall O’Brien
"Mountain at My Gates"	2015	NABIL
"Give It All"	2015	NABIL
"Birch Tree"	2016	Dave Ma
"Exits"	2019	Albert Moya
"On the Luna"	2019	Kit Monteith, Alex Knowles
"White Onions"	2019	Alex Knowles
"Moonlight"	2019	Unknown
"Cafe D'Athens"	2019	Jonny Costello, Charlotte Audrey
"In Degrees"	2019	Aaron Brown
"Sunday"	2019	Leif Podhajsky
"Black Bull"	2019	Niall O’Brien
"The Runner"	2019	Quentin Deronzier
"Into the Surf"	2019	Steve Warne
"Like Lightning"	2019	Virginie Kypriotis
"Neptune"	2020	David East
"Wake Me Up"	2021	David East
"2am"	2022	Tanu Muino
"Looking High"	2022	Kit Monteith
"2001"	2022	Esteban
"Life Is Yours"	2022	Toby L
