= Life Is Yours Tour =

2022–23 concert tour by Foals

- Tour by Foals
- Location: Asia; Europe; North America
- Associated album: Life Is Yours
- Start date: 20 April 2022
- End date: 4 September 2023
- No. of shows: 62 in Europe; 1 in Asia; 52 in North America; 115 in total

Foals concert chronology
- Everything Not Saved Will Be Lost World Tour (2019–21); Life Is Yours Tour (2022–23); ...

The Life Is Yours Tour was a concert tour by British indie rock band Foals in support of the band's seventh studio album, Life Is Yours. The tour started on 20 April 2022 and concluded on 4 September 2023. The remaining dates from the band's Everything Not Saved Will Be Lost World Tour were rescheduled from April 2020 to April 2021 due to the COVID-19 pandemic. Ten months later, in March 2021, Foals rescheduled their remaining concerts to 2022.

Goat Girl, Shame, Yard Act, and Egyptian Blue supported Foals on select UK dates.

== Background ==
In March 2019 Foals embarked on the Everything Not Saved Will Be Lost World Tour, playing until February 2020 in Singapore. The band's remaining tour dates were rescheduled to 2022 due to the COVID-19 pandemic.

In April 2022, 10 days before the tour commenced, it was re-branded to the 'Life Is Yours Tour' in support of their then-upcoming seventh studio album.

The Life Is Yours Tour is the band's first tour as a trio. Jack Freeman joined Foals on tour, playing bass, synthesizer and providing backing vocals and Joe Price joined on keyboards and synthesizer, taking the places of bassist Walter Gervers who departed in 2018, and Edwin Congreave who left the band in 2021.

In June 2022, Foals announced six UK dates in 2023 for intimate concerts.

A few days later the band announced a 25-date headline tour in North America, starting in October and concluding in December 2022.

== Set list ==
This set list is representative of the performance on 16 December 2022 in New York City, New York. It is not representative of the set list at all concerts for the duration of the tour.

1. "Wake Me Up"
2. "The Runner"
3. "2001"
4. "Balloons"
5. "Olympic Airways"
6. "My Number"
7. "Black Gold"
8. "Birch Tree"
9. "2am"
10. "In Degrees"
11. "Spanish Sahara"
12. "Red Socks Pugie"
13. "Providence"
14. "Snake Oil"
15. "Mountain at My Gates"

Encore

16. "Inhaler"
17. "Two Steps, Twice"

== Tour dates ==
Date	City	Country	Venue	Support act(s)
Europe
20 April 2022	Edinburgh	Scotland	Usher Hall	Goat Girl
21 April 2022	Edinburgh	Scotland	Usher Hall	Goat Girl
23 April 2022	Birmingham	England	Utilita Arena Birmingham	Goat Girl
25 April 2022	Hull	England	Bonus Arena	Goat Girl
26 April 2022	Newcastle	England	O_{2} City Hall	Goat Girl
27 April 2022	Brighton	England	Brighton Centre	Goat Girl
29 April 2022	London	England	Olympia London	Shame, Goat Girl
30 April 2022	London	England	Olympia London	Shame, Egyptian Blue
1 May 2022	London	England	Olympia London	Shame, Egyptian Blue
2 May 2022	London	England	Olympia London	Shame, Egyptian Blue
5 May 2022	Blackpool	England	Empress Ballroom	Yard Act
6 May 2022	Blackpool	England	Empress Ballroom	Yard Act
8 May 2022	London	England	O_{2} Academy Brixton	Goat Girl
14 May 2022	Berlin	Germany	Verti Music Hall	Egyptian Blue
15 May 2022	Amsterdam	Netherlands	AFAS Live	Egyptian Blue
16 May 2022	Paris	France	Zénith Paris	Egyptian Blue
18 May 2022	Zürich	Switzerland	X-TRA Zürich	Egyptian Blue
29 May 2022 (Note: The 29 May 2022 concert in Coventry was part of BBC Radio 1's Big Weekend.)	Coventry	England	War Memorial Park	—
4 June 2022 (Note: The 4 June 2022 concert in Warsaw was part of Orange Warsaw Festival.)	Warsaw	Poland	Sluzewiec Racetrack	—
10 June 2022 (Note: The 10 June 2022 concert in Copenhagen was part of Syd For Solen.)	Copenhagen	Denmark	Søndermarken	—
16 June 2022 (Note: The 16 June 2022 concert in Santiago de Compostela was part of O Son do Camiño.)	Santiago de Compostela	Spain	Auditorio Monte do Gozo	—
18 June 2022 (Note: The 18 June 2022 concert in Scheeßel was part of Hurricane Festival.)	Scheeßel	Germany	Eichenring	—
19 June 2022 (Note: The 19 June 2022 concert in Neuhausen ob Eck was part of Southside Festival.)	Neuhausen ob Eck	Germany	take-off GewerbePark	—
21 June 2022	Cologne	Germany	E-Werk	Egyptian Blue
24 June 2022 (Note: The 24 June 2022 concert in Pilton was part of Glastonbury Festival.)	Pilton	England	Worthy Farm	—
26 June 2022 (Note: The 26 June 2022 concert in Werchter was part of Rock Werchter Encore.)	Werchter	Belgium	Festivalpark Werchter	—
27 June 2022	Dublin	Ireland	Fairview Park	The Murder Capital
29 June 2022 (Note: The 29 June 2022 concert in Manchester was part of Sounds of the City.)	Manchester	England	Castlefield Bowl	Yard Act
2 July 2022 (Note: The 2 July 2022 concert in Belfort was part of Eurockéennes.)	Belfort	France	Lac de Malsaucy	—
7 July 2022 (Note: The 7 July 2022 concert in Madrid was part of Mad Cool.)	Madrid	Spain	IFEMA	—
8 July 2022	Leeds	England	Millennium Square	Egyptian Blue
9 July 2022 (Note: The 9 July 2022 concert in Glasgow was part of TRNSMT.)	Glasgow	Scotland	Glasgow Green	—
16 July 2022 (Note: The 16 July 2022 concert in Lisbon was part of Super Bock Super Rock.)	Lisbon	Portugal	Parque das Nações	—
23 July 2022 (Note: The 23 July 2022 concert in Suffolk was part of Latitude Festival.)	Suffolk	England	Henham Park	—
Asia
30 July 2022 (Note: The 30 July 2022 concert in Yuzawa was part of Fuji Rock Festival.)	Yuzawa	Japan	Naeba Ski Resort	—
North America
28 October 2022	Las Vegas	United States	Brooklyn Bowl	Inner Wave, Gustaf
29 October 2022	San Diego	United States	Soma San Diego	Inner Wave, Gustaf
30 October 2022	Phoenix	United States	The Van Buren	Inner Wave, Gustaf
1 November 2022	Austin	United States	Stubb's Bar-B-Q	Inner Wave, Gustaf
3 November 2022	Houston	United States	Downstairs at White Oak Music Hall	Inner Wave, Gustaf
4 November 2022	Fort Worth	United States	Tannahill's Tavern & Music Hall	Inner Wave, Gustaf
5 November 2022	Fort Worth	United States	Tannahill's Tavern & Music Hall	Inner Wave, Gustaf
7 November 2022	Denver	United States	Mission Ballroom	Inner Wave, Gustaf
8 November 2022	Salt Lake City	United States	The Complex	Inner Wave, Gustaf
11 November 2022	Vancouver	Canada	Queen Elizabeth Theatre	Inner Wave, Gustaf
12 November 2022	Seattle	United States	The Showbox SoDo	Inner Wave, Gustaf
13 November 2022	Portland	United States	Roseland Theater	Inner Wave, Gustaf
15 November 2022	Oakland	United States	Fox Oakland Theatre	Inner Wave, Gustaf
16 November 2022	Los Angeles	United States	Hollywood Palladium	Inner Wave, Gustaf
19 November 2022 (Note: The 19 November 2022 concert in Mexico City was part of Corona Capital.)	Mexico City	Mexico	Autódromo Hermanos Rodríguez	—
1 December 2022	Minneapolis	United States	Fillmore Minneapolis	Inner Wave, Glove
2 December 2022	Chicago	United States	The Vic Theatre	Inner Wave, Glove
3 December 2022	Chicago	United States	The Vic Theatre	Inner Wave, Glove
4 December 2022 (Note: The 4 December 2022 concert in St. Louis was part of 105.7 The Point’s Ho Ho Show.)	St. Louis	United States	The Pageant	Inner Wave, Glove
6 December 2022	Atlanta	United States	The Eastern	Inner Wave, Glove
7 December 2022	Nashville	United States	Marathon Music Works	Inner Wave, Glove
9 December 2022	Columbus	United States	KEMBA Live!	Inner Wave, Glove
10 December 2022	Toronto	Canada	Queen Elizabeth Theatre	Inner Wave, Glove
11 December 2022	Cleveland	United States	The Agora	Inner Wave, Glove
13 December 2022	Washington, D.C.	United States	The Anthem	Inner Wave, Glove
14 December 2022	Philadelphia	United States	Franklin Music Hall	Inner Wave, Glove
16 December 2022	New York	United States	Terminal 5	Inner Wave, Glove
17 December 2022	Boston	United States	Roadrunner	Inner Wave, Glove
18 December 2022	Portland	United States	State Theatre	Inner Wave, Glove
Europe
4 May 2023 (Note: Two shows. Presented by Vinilo Record Store.)	Southampton	England	Engine Rooms Southampton	—
5 May 2023 (Note: Two shows. Presented by Jacaranda Records.)	Liverpool	England	O_{2} Academy Liverpool	—
7 May 2023 (Note: Two shows. Presented by Assai Records.)	Edinburgh	Scotland	The Liquid Room	—
8 May 2023	Glasgow	Scotland	SWG3 Warehouse	—
9 May 2023 (Note: Presented by Truck Store.)	Oxford	England	O_{2} Academy Oxford	—
11 May 2023 (Note: Two shows. Presented by Banquet Records.)	Kingston upon Thames	England	PRYZM	—
North America
18 May 2023	Monterrey	Mexico	Showcenter	TBA
20 May 2023	Mexico City	Mexico	Pepsi Center WTC	TBA
21 May 2023 (Note: The 21 May 2023 concert in Guadalajara is part of Corona Capital Guadalajara.)	Guadalajara	Mexico	Valle VFG	—
Europe
22 June 2023 (Note: The 22 June 2023 concert in Milan is part of I-Days.)	Milan	Italy	Ippodromo SNAI San Siro	TBA
23 June 2023 (Note: The 23 June 2023 concert in Zagreb was originally scheduled to take place at the Salata Open Air Arena.)	Zagreb	Croatia	Tvornica Kulture	Svemirko
25 June 2023	Warsaw	Poland	Progresja Summer Stage	TBA
27 June 2023	Vienna	Austria	Planet.tt Bank Austria Halle	TBA
28 June 2023	Prague	Czech Republic	Žluté lázně	TBA
30 June 2023 (Note: The 30 June 2023 concert in Nort-sur-Erdre is part of La Nuit de l’Erdre.)	Belfort	France	Lac de Malsaucy	TBA
1 July 2023 (Note: The 1 July 2023 concert in Nort-sur-Erdre is part of La Nuit de l’Erdre.)	Nort-sur-Erdre	France	Le Port Mulon	—
North America (supporting Paramore)
6 July 2023	New Orleans	United States	Smoothie King Center	—
8 July 2023	Fort Worth	United States	Dickies Arena	—
9 July 2023	Austin	United States	Moody Center	—
11 July 2023	Houston	United States	Toyota Center	—
13 July 2023	Denver	United States	Ball Arena	—
15 July 2023	Palm Desert	United States	Acrisure Arena	—
16 July 2023	San Diego	United States	Viejas Arena	—
18 July 2023 (Note: Without Paramore.)	Los Angeles	United States	The Belasco	—
19 July 2023	Inglewood	United States	Kia Forum	—
20 July 2023	Inglewood	United States	Kia Forum	—
22 July 2023	San Francisco	United States	Chase Center	—
24 July 2023	Seattle	United States	Climate Pledge Arena	—
25 July 2023	Portland	United States	Veterans Memorial Coliseum	—
27 July 2023	Salt Lake City	United States	Vivint Arena	—
29 July 2023	Tulsa	United States	BOK Center	—
30 July 2023	St. Louis	United States	Enterprise Center	—
2 August 2023	Saint Paul	United States	Xcel Energy Center	—
3 August 2023 (Note: The 3 August 2023 concert in Chicago is part of Lollapalooza Aftershow. Without Paramore.)	Chicago	United States	Thalia Hall	—
4 August 2023 (Note: The 4 August 2023 concert in Chicago is part of Lollapalooza. Without Paramore.)	Chicago	United States	Grant Park	—
6 August 2023 (Note: The 6 August 2023 concert in Montreal is part of Osheaga Festival. Without Paramore.)	Montreal	Canada	Parc Jean-Drapeau	—
Europe
10 August 2023 (Note: The 10 August 2023 concert in Budapest is part of Sziget Festival.)	Budapest	Hungary	Hajógyári Island	—
11 August 2023 (Note: The 11 August 2023 concert in Trenčín is part of GrapeFestival.)	Trenčín	Slovakia	Trenčín Airfield	—
12 August 2023 (Note: The 12 August 2023 concert in Landerneau is part of Fête du Bruit.)	Landerneau	France	Les Jardins De La Palud	—
TBA (Note: The concert in Biddinghuizen is part of Lowlands. Date TBC.)	Biddinghuizen	Netherlands	Evenemententerrein Walibi Holland	—
20 August 2023 (Note: The 20 August 2023 concert in Hasselt is part of Pukkelpop.)	Hasselt	Belgium	Domein Kiewit	—
25 August 2023 (Note: The 25 August 2023 concert in Reading is part of Reading Festival.)	Reading	England	Little John's Farm	—
26 August 2023 (Note: The 26 August 2023 concert in Leeds is part of Leeds Festival.)	Leeds	England	Bramham Park	—
27 August 2023 (Note: The 27 August 2023 concert in Saint-Cloud is part of Rock en Seine.)	Saint-Cloud	France	Parc de Saint-Cloud	—
TBA (Note: The concert in Málaga is part of Festival Internacional Cala Mijas. Date TBC.)	Málaga	Spain	Sonora Mijas	—
2 September 2023 (Note: The 2 September 2023 concert in Lisbon is part of MEO Kalorama Lisboa.)	Lisbon	Portugal	Bela Vista Park	—
4 September 2023 (Note: The 4 September 2023 concert in Istanbul is part of PSM Loves Summer. Originally scheduled to take place on 15 August 2023.)	Istanbul	Turkey	Zorlu PSM	—
