= Everything Not Saved Will Be Lost World Tour =

2019–21 concert tour by Foals

- Tour by Foals
- Associated albums: Everything Not Saved Will Be Lost – Part 1; Everything Not Saved Will Be Lost – Part 2
- Start date: 4 March 2019
- End date: 30 August 2021
- No. of shows: 130

Foals concert chronology
- What Went Down Tour (2015–16); Everything Not Saved Will Be Lost World Tour (2019–21); Life Is Yours Tour (2022–23)

Everything Not Saved Will Be Lost World Tour was a concert tour by British indie rock band Foals in support of the band's two-part album Everything Not Saved Will Be Lost. The tour started on 4 March 2019 and concluded on 30 August 2021. The tour is the band's first in two years following the release of their 2015 album What Went Down as well as the first tour following the exit of bassist Walter Gervers.

== Background ==
Following a handful of performances in 2017, including a headline performance at the 2017 "Citadel Festival" in London's Gunnersbury Park, the band took a break to work on their fifth album. In January 2018, bassist Walter Gervers announced that he would be leaving the band.

In January 2019, the band announced the release of two albums Everything Not Saved Will Be Lost – Part 1 & Everything Not Saved Will Be Lost – Part 2 alongside dates across USA & Europe as well as the release of their first single in three years, "Exits". The following month Everything Everything bassist Jeremy Pritchard was announced as the band's touring bassist across their 2019 dates alongside touring percussionists Kit Monteith from the band Trophy Wife and Vincent Taeger.

In October 2019, shortly before the release of Everything Not Saved Will Be Lost – Part 2, the band announced a documentary entitled Rip Up The Road for Amazon Studios recorded across the 2019 live dates, as well as releasing a live EP featuring recordings from the band's two headline performances at London's Alexandra Palace.

Due to the COVID-19 pandemic, Foals rescheduled their remaining tour dates in April 2020. Ten months later, in March 2021, they were rescheduled to April 2022. A few days before the tour started, it was rebranded to the Life Is Yours Tour.

== Set list ==
This set list is representative of the performance on 22 June 2019 in London, England. It does not represent the set list at all concerts for the duration of the tour.

1. "On the Luna"
2. "Mountain at My Gates"
3. "Snake Oil"
4. "Olympic Airways"
5. "My Number"
6. "Black Gold"
7. "Sunday"
8. "Syrups"
9. "Providence"
10. "Spanish Sahara"
11. "Red Socks Pugie"
12. "Exits"
13. "In Degrees"
14. "White Onions"
15. "Inhaler"

Encore

16. "Black Bull"
17. "What Went Down"
18. "Two Steps Twice"

== Tour dates ==
Date	City	Country	Venue	Support act(s)
Europe
4 March 2019	Manchester	England	Gorilla	N/A
5 March 2019	Edinburgh	Scotland	Liquid Room	N/A
7 March 2019	London	England	EartH	N/A
North America
16 March 2019 (Note: The 16 March 2019 concert in Mexico City was part of Vive Latino.)	Mexico City	Mexico	Foro Sol	N/A
18 March 2019	Vancouver	Canada	The Orpheum	Bear Hands, Kyiv
19 March 2019	Portland	United States	Roseland Theater	Bear Hands, Kyiv
20 March 2019	Seattle	United States	Paramount Theatre	Bear Hands, Kyiv
22 March 2019	Oakland	United States	Fox Oakland Theatre	Bear Hands, Kyiv
23 March 2019	San Diego	United States	The Observatory North Park	Bear Hands, Kyiv
24 March 2019	Los Angeles	United States	Shrine Exposition Hall	Bear Hands, Kyiv
27 March 2019	Las Vegas	United States	Brooklyn Bowl	Bear Hands, Kyiv
South America
30 March 2019 (Note: The 30 March 2019 concert in Buenos Aires was part of Lollapalooza Argentina.)	Buenos Aires	Argentina	Hipódromo de San Isidro	N/A
31 March 2019 (Note: The 30 March 2019 concert in Buenos Aires was part of Lollapalooza Chile.)	Santiago	Chile	O'Higgins Park	N/A
2 April 2019	Santiago	Chile	Teatro La Cúpula	N/A
5 April 2019 (Note: The 5 April 2019 concert in São Paulo was part of Lollapalooza Brazil.)	São Paulo	Brazil	Autódromo José Carlos Pace	N/A
7 April 2019 (Note: The 7 April 2019 concert in Bogotá was part of Estéreo Picnic Festival.)	Bogotá	Colombia	Centro de Eventos Briceño 18	N/A
North America
12 April 2019	New York City	United States	Brooklyn Bowl	Preoccupations, Omni
13 April 2019	New York City	United States	Brooklyn Bowl	Preoccupations, Omni
14 April 2019	New York City	United States	Brooklyn Bowl	Preoccupations, Omni
16 April 2019	Washington D.C.	United States	9:30 Club	Preoccupations, Omni
18 April 2019	Washington D.C.	United States	9:30 Club	Preoccupations, Omni
19 April 2019	Boston	United States	House of Blues	Preoccupations, Omni
20 April 2019	Philadelphia	United States	The Fillmore Philadelphia	Preoccupations, Omni
22 April 2019	Toronto	Canada	Rebel	Preoccupations, Omni
23 April 2019	Columbus	United States	Express Live!	Preoccupations, The Blue Stones, The Cordial Sins
24 April 2019	St. Louis	United States	The Pageant	Preoccupations, Omni
26 April 2019	Detroit	United States	Saint Andrew's Hall	Preoccupations, Omni
27 April 2019	Chicago	United States	Riviera Theatre	Preoccupations, Omni
28 April 2019	Milwaukee	United States	The Rave	Preoccupations, Omni
30 April 2019	Minneapolis	United States	First Avenue	Preoccupations, Omni
2 May 2019 (Note: The 2 May 2019 concert in Kansas City Foals supported Interpol.)	Kansas City	United States	Arvest Bank Theatre at the Midland	N/A
4 May 2019	Atlanta	United States	Center Stage Theater	N/A
5 May 2019 (Note: The 5 May 2019 concert in Atlanta was part of the Shaky Knees Music Festival.)	Atlanta	United States	Central Park	N/A
Europe
10 May 2019 (Note: The 10 May 2019 concert in Brighton was part of The Great Escape.)	Brighton	England	Concorde 2	Blaenavon, Boniface
12 May 2019	Brussels	Belgium	Ancienne Belgique	Yak
13 May 2019	Paris	France	Bataclan	Yak
15 May 2019	Lausanne	Switzerland	Les Docks	Yak
16 May 2019	Milan	Italy	Fabrique	Yak
17 May 2019	Luxembourg City	Luxembourg	Den Atelier	Yak
19 May 2019	Amsterdam	Netherlands	Paradiso	Yak
20 May 2019	Berlin	Germany	Huxley's Neue Welt	Yak
23 May 2019	Leeds	England	O_{2} Academy Leeds	N/A
24 May 2019 (Note: The 24 May 2019 concert in Newcastle was part of This is Tomorrow.)	Newcastle	England	Exhibition Park	N/A
25 May 2019 (Note: The 24 May 2019 concert in Newcastle was part of BBC Radio 1's Big Weekend.)	Middlesbrough	England	Stewart Park	N/A
26 May 2019 (Note: Foals performed two shows on this date.)	Dundee	Scotland	Fat Sam's	N/A
5 June 2019	Hamburg	Germany	Große Freiheit 36	Marsicans
6 June 2019 (Note: The 6 June 2019 concert in Aarhus was part of NorthSide Festival.)	Aarhus	Denmark	Ådalen	N/A
7 June 2019 (Note: The 7 June 2019 concert in Nürburg was part of Rock am Ring.)	Nürburg	Germany	Nürburgring	N/A
9 June 2019 (Note: The 7 June 2019 concert in Nürburg was part of Rock im Park.)	Nuremberg	Germany	Zeppelinfeld	N/A
11 June 2019	Manchester	England	O_{2} Victoria Warehouse	Yak
12 June 2019	Manchester	England	O_{2} Victoria Warehouse	Yak
14 June 2019 (Note: The 14 June 2019 concert in Kent was part of the Forest Live concert series.)	Kent	England	Bedgebury National Pinetum	Yak, Kyiv
15 June 2019	Birmingham	England	Digbeth Arena	Yak
16 June 2019	Birmingham	England	Digbeth Arena	Yak
18 June 2019	Glasgow	Scotland	SWG3 Galvanizers Yard	Yak, Kyiv
20 June 2019 (Note: The 20 June 2019 concert in Brandon was part of the Thetford Forest Live concert series.)	Brandon	England	Thetford Forest	Yak, Kyiv
21 June 2019	London	England	Alexandra Palace	Yak
22 June 2019	London	England	Alexandra Palace	Yak
24 June 2019 (Note: The 24 June 2019 concert in Zagreb was part of INmusic Festival.)	Zagreb	Croatia	Jarun	N/A
26 June 2019	Bournemouth	England	Bournemouth International Centre	Yak
27 June 2019	Kingston upon Thames	England	PRYZM	N/A
29 June 2019 (Note: The 29 June 2019 concert in Pilton was part of Glastonbury Festival.)	Pilton	England	Worthy Farm	N/A
2 July 2019 (Note: The 2 July 2019 concert in Dublin was part of Trinity College Dublin Summer Series.)	Dublin	Ireland	Trinity College Dublin	N/A
5 July 2019 (Note: The 5 July 2019 concert in Barcelona was part of Cruilla Barcelona.)	Barcelona	Spain	Parc del Fòrum	N/A
7 July 2019 (Note: The 7 July 2019 concert in Beuningen was part of Down the Rabbit Hole.)	Beuningen	Netherlands	Vakantiepark De Groene Heuvels	N/A
Oceania
12 July 2019	Auckland	New Zealand	Auckland Town Hall	Daffodils
13 July 2019	Auckland	New Zealand	Auckland Town Hall	Warpaint
15 July 2019	Melbourne	Australia	Margaret Court Arena	Warpaint
17 July 2019	Sydney	Australia	Hordern Pavilion	Warpaint
19 July 2019 (Note: The 19 July 2019 concert in Byron Bay was part of Splendour in the Grass.)	Byron Bay	Australia	North Byron Parklands	N/A
21 July 2019	Perth	Australia	Metro City	N/A
Europe
26 July 2019 (Note: The 26 July 2019 concert in Benidorm was part of Low Festival.)	Benidorm	Spain	Ciudad Deportiva Guillermo Amo	N/A
27 July 2019 (Note: The 27 July 2019 concert in Steventon was part of Truck Festival.)	Steventon	England	Hill Farm	N/A
28 July 2019 (Note: The 28 July 2019 concert in Pikehall was part of Y Not Festival.)	Pikehall	England	Peak District National Park	N/A
31 July 2019 (Note: The 31 July 2019 concert in Freiburg was part of Zelt-Musik-Festival.)	Freiburg	Germany	Mundenhof-Gelände	N/A
1 August 2019 (Note: The 1 August 2019 concert in Lustenau was part of Szene Openair.)	Lustenau	Austria	Am alten Rhein	N/A
3 August 2019 (Note: The 3 August 2019 concert in Katowice was part of Off Festival.)	Katowice	Poland	Dolina Trzech Stawów	N/A
Asia
14 August 2019	Bangkok	Thailand	Moonstar Studio	N/A
16 August 2019 (Note: The 16 and 17 August 2019 concerts in Osaka and Chiba were part of Summer Sonic.)	Osaka	Japan	Maishima Sports Island	N/A
17 August 2019	Chiba	Japan	Makuhari Messe	N/A
Europe
22 August 2019 (Note: The 22 August 2019 concert in Rümlang was part of Zurich Open Air.)	Rümlang	Switzerland	Glattbrug	N/A
23 August 2019 (Note: The 23 August 2019 concert in Rümlang was part of Check in Party.)	Guéret	France	Aérodrome de Guéret	N/A
24 August 2019 (Note: The 24 August 2019 concert in Charleville-Mézières was part of Le Cabaret Vert.)	Charleville-Mézières	France	Square Bayard	N/A
25 August 2019 (Note: The 24 August 2019 concert in Saint-Cloud was part of Rock en Seine.)	Saint-Cloud	France	Parc de Saint-Cloud	N/A
27 August 2019	Kyiv	Ukraine	Art-Zavod Platforma	Sea Girls
29 August 2019	Moscow	Russia	Stadium Live	Sea Girls
30 August 2019	Saint Petersburg	Russia	Morze	Sea Girls
13 October 2019 (Note: The 13 October 2019 concert in Paris was part of Arte Concert.)	Paris	France	La Gaîté Lyrique	N/A
18 October 2019	London	England	House of Vans	N/A
23 October 2019	Oxford	England	O_{2} Academy Oxford	N/A
24 October 2019	Leeds	England	Leeds Beckett Students Union	N/A
1 November 2019 (Note: The 1 November 2019 concert in Bilbao was part of BIME Live.)	Bilbao	Spain	Bilbao Exhibition Centre	N/A
7 November 2019	Kingston upon Thames	England	PRYZM	N/A
17 February 2020 (Note: The 17 February 2020 concert in London was part of BRITs Week War Child Benefit.)	London	England	O_{2} Shepherd's Bush Empire	N/A
Asia
29 February 2020 (Note: The 29 February 2020 concert in Singapore was part of Garden Beats.)	Singapore		Fort Canning Park	N/A
Europe
12 August 2021	Cardiff	Wales	Cardiff Castle	N/A
13 August 2021 (Note: The 13 August 2021 concert in Cornwall was part of Boardmasters Festival.)	Cornwall	England	Watergate Bay Newquay	N/A
14 August 2021	Swansea	Wales	Singleton Park	N/A
30 August 2021 (Note: The 30 August 2021 concert in London was part of All Points East.)	London	England	Victoria Park	N/A

=== Cancelled shows ===
Date	City	Country	Venue	Reason for cancellation
1 March 2020	Bangkok	Thailand	Bangkok Fest	COVID-19 pandemic.
3 March 2020	Nagoya	Japan	Club Quattro	COVID-19 pandemic.
4 March 2020	Osaka	Japan	BIGCAT	COVID-19 pandemic.
5 March 2020	Tokyo	Japan	Studio Coast	COVID-19 pandemic.
7 March 2020	Manila	Philippines	Wanderland Festival	COVID-19 pandemic.
10 March 2020	Jakarta	Indonesia	GBK Basketball Hall	COVID-19 pandemic.
17 April 2020	Mayrhofen	Austria	Snowbombing	COVID-19 pandemic.
24 April 2020	Cologne	Germany	C/O Pop Festival	COVID-19 pandemic.
13 May 2020	Mexico City	Mexico	Pepsi Center WTC	COVID-19 pandemic.
15 May 2020	Monterrey	Mexico	Showcenter	COVID-19 pandemic.
16 May 2020	Guadalajara	Mexico	Corona Capital	COVID-19 pandemic.
20 May 2020	Los Angeles	United States	Greek Theatre	COVID-19 pandemic.
22 May 2020	Napa	United States	BottleRock Napa Valley	COVID-19 pandemic.
23 May 2020	Troutdale	United States	McMenamins Edgefield Amphitheater	COVID-19 pandemic.
24 May 2020	Vancouver	Canada	PNE Forum	COVID-19 pandemic.
26 May 2020	Salt Lake City	United States	The Union Event Center	COVID-19 pandemic.
29 May 2020	Dallas	United States	South Side Ballroom	COVID-19 pandemic.
1 June 2020	Atlanta	United States	Coca-Cola Roxy	COVID-19 pandemic.
2 June 2020	Raleigh	United States	Red Hat Amphitheater	COVID-19 pandemic.
5 June 2020	New York City	United States	Governors Ball Music Festival	COVID-19 pandemic.
6 June 2020	Boston	United States	Rockland Trust Bank Pavilion	COVID-19 pandemic.
7 June 2020	Montreal	Canada	M Telus	COVID-19 pandemic.
9 June 2020	Detroit	United States	The Fillmore Detroit	COVID-19 pandemic.
10 June 2020	Chicago	United States	Byline Bank Aragon Ballroom	COVID-19 pandemic.
23 June 2020	Rome	Italy	Rock in Roma	COVID-19 pandemic.
26 June 2020	Clermont-Ferrand	France	Europavox	COVID-19 pandemic.
27 June 2020	Luxembourg City	Luxembourg	Siren's Call	COVID-19 pandemic.
4 July 2020	Gdynia	Poland	Open'er Festival	COVID-19 pandemic.
13 July 2020	Athens	Greece	EJEKT Festival	COVID-19 pandemic.
15 July 2020	Bonțida	Romania	Electric Castle	COVID-19 pandemic.
19 July 2020	Benicàssim	Spain	Festival International de Benicàssim	COVID-19 pandemic.
22 July 2020	Istanbul	Turkey	Istanbul International Jazz Festival	COVID-19 pandemic.
25 July 2020	Aulnoye-Aymeries	France	Les Nuits Secretes	COVID-19 pandemic.
30 July 2020	Charlbury	England	Wilderness Festival	COVID-19 pandemic.
2 August 2020	Cumbria	England	Kendal Calling	COVID-19 pandemic.
6 August 2020	Budapest	Hungary	Sziget Festival	COVID-19 pandemic.
7 August 2020	Piešťany	Slovakia	GrapeFestival	COVID-19 pandemic.
23 August 2020	Biddinghuizen	Netherlands	Lowlands	COVID-19 pandemic.
4 September 2020	Stradbally	Ireland	Electric Picnic	COVID-19 pandemic.
22 May 2021	Riga	Latvia	Palladium Riga	COVID-19 pandemic.
23 May 2021	Vilnius	Lithuania	Compensa Concert Hall	COVID-19 pandemic.
25 May 2021	Minsk	Belarus	Prime Hall	COVID-19 pandemic.
27 May 2021	Lviv	Ukraine	!FESTrepublic	COVID-19 pandemic.
23 June 2021	Sesto al Reghena	Italy	Sexto 'Nplugged	COVID-19 pandemic.
1 July 2021	Belfort	France	Eurockéennes	COVID-19 pandemic.
