= Cassius (song) =

Single by Foals

from the album Antidotes
- Released: 10 March 2008
- Genre: Math rock; dance-punk
- Length: 3:49
- Label: Transgressive
- Songwriter(s): Jack Bevan; Edwin Congreave; Walter Gervers; Yannis Philippakis; Jimmy Smith

Foals singles chronology
"Balloons" (2007)	"Cassius" (2008)	"Red Socks Pugie" (2008)

Antidotes track listing
- 1. "The French Open"; 2. "Cassius"; 3. "Red Socks Pugie"; 4. "Olympic Airways"; 5. "Electric Bloom"; 6. "Balloons"; 7. "Heavy Water"; 8. "Two Steps, Twice"; 9. "Big Big Love (Fig. 2)"; 10. "Like Swimming"; 11. "Tron"

"Cassius" is the second single from the album Antidotes by Foals. It is their fifth single in total to date. It was released as a digital download on 18 February 2008 and on CD and vinyl on 10 March 2008.

In a video interview with NME, lead singer Yannis Philippakis stated that the track was "the most straightforward song on the album. It's trying to deal with somebody being two-faced or, even to the extreme, someone having a split personality. The reason for why it's called Cassius – Cassius Clay who became Mohammad Ali, it's almost like there's two people in one and Cassius, the conspirator who instigated the assassination of Julius Caesar, who is a very literal symbol of being two faced".

The video was directed by Dave Ma and shows the band playing with hanging hearts and pills.

"Cassius" peaked at number 26 on the UK Singles Chart and is their second highest-charting song after "My Number". The song was number 45 on Rolling Stone's list of the 100 Best Songs of 2008.

== Formats and track listings ==
Digital download
No.	Title	Length
1.	"Cassius"	3:50

Digital EP
No.	Title	Length
1.	"Cassius"	3:50
2.	"Cassius" (XFM session)	3:27
3.	"Cassius" (Keiran Hebden version)	11:01
4.	"Cassius" (Tensnake remix)	8:09

CD single
No.	Title	Length
1.	"Cassius"	3:50
2.	"Cassius" (Keiran Hebden version)	11:01

7" single
No.	Title	Length
1.	"Cassius"	3:50
2.	"The Chronic"	4:57

7" single
No.	Title	Length
1.	"Cassius"	3:50
2.	"A Song for You"	4:10

== Charts ==
Chart (2008)	Peak position
Scotland (OCC)	6
UK Singles (OCC)	26
