= Total Life Forever =

2010 album by Foals

Studio album by Foals
- Released: 10 May 2010
- Recorded: September 2009
- Studio: Svenska Grammofon (Gothenburg, Sweden)
- Genre: Indie rock; post-rock; math rock; post-punk revival
- Length: 50:21
- Label: Transgressive; Sub Pop
- Producer: Luke Smith

Foals chronology
Antidotes (2008)	Total Life Forever (2010)	Holy Fire (2013)

Singles from Total Life Forever
- 1. "Spanish Sahara" Released: 17 April 2010; 2. "This Orient" Released: 3 May 2010; 3. "Miami" Released: 4 July 2010; 4. "Blue Blood" Released: 8 November 2010

Total Life Forever is the second studio album by British indie rock band Foals, released on 10 May 2010 through Transgressive Records. Prior to the album's release, the band described it as sounding "like the dream of an eagle dying". It was produced by Luke Smith, and was recorded at Svenska Grammofon Studion in Gothenburg. Upon its release, the album charted in numerous countries worldwide, including number eight on the UK Albums Chart.

== Promotion and release ==
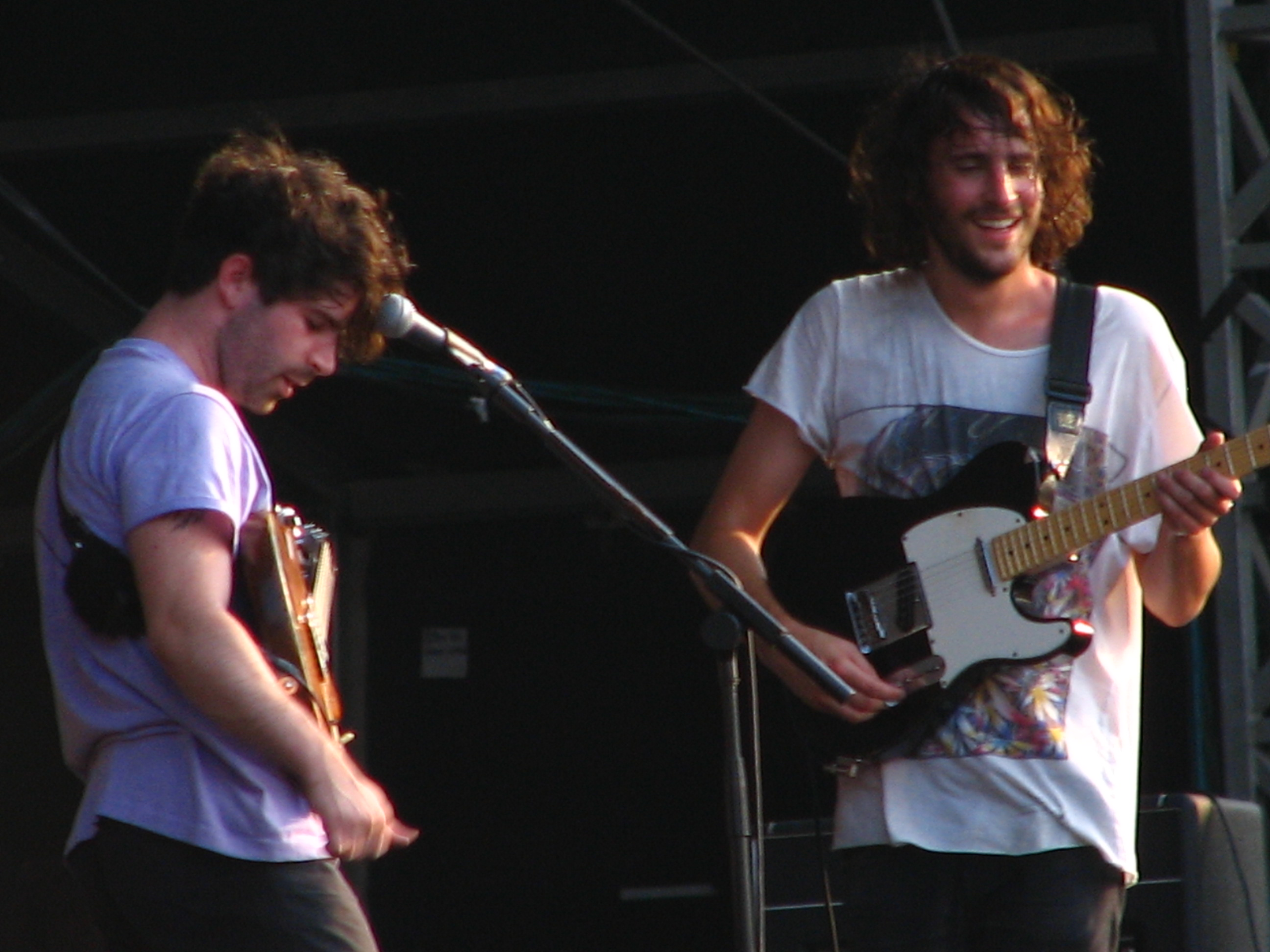
Foals supporting Blur in Hyde Park, London, 2 July 2009

In January 2009, the band released three semi-instrumental segments of tracks through the band's MySpace profile, giving an insight into the band's recording process. A short three date tour of the United Kingdom took place in April 2009.

During July 2009, the band played an intimate show for Rockfeedback, as a warm up for future festival shows and a chance to debut songs from their second album. On 2 July, the band supported Blur during their reunion show in Hyde Park, London, playing an untitled new song which frontman Yannis Philippakis stated was unfinished. Later the same month, the band appeared at the 2009 T in the Park festival, performing new songs "Total Life Forever" and "Dirty Waves". Both songs had been previously aired during the band's appearance at The Breeders-curated All Tomorrow's Parties festival in May 2009. In September 2009, the band performed at London's Heaven as part of Transgressive Records' fifth anniversary, performing new songs "Spanish Sahara", "Death Surf" and one other untitled track.

The album's title was revealed on 24 February 2010. Zane Lowe premiered the promotional track "Spanish Sahara" on BBC Radio 1, naming the track his "Hottest Record in the World" for 1 March 2010. From 8pm the same day, a remix of the track was made available to download from Foals' official website. The accompanying video was added to Foals' YouTube page on 2 March 2010. A limited number vinyl of "Spanish Sahara" was released on 17 April 2010, to mark the 2010 Record Store Day. In support of the album, the band announced a fourteen date tour of Europe throughout April–May 2010, including dates in Paris, Amsterdam, Berlin and the United Kingdom. These were the band's first live performances of the year.

Following "Spanish Sahara"'s limited release, the album's first official single was announced as "This Orient", released on 3 May 2010. The track reached number 97 on the UK Singles Chart. Second single "Miami" was then released on 4 July 2010. It reached No. 127 on the same chart. Third single "Blue Blood" was released on 8 November 2010.

== Reception ==
Professional ratings
Aggregate scores
Source	Rating
AnyDecentMusic?	7.7/10
Metacritic	78/100
Review scores
Source	Rating
AllMusic	3.5/5 stars
The A.V. Club	A−
The Daily Telegraph	4/5 stars
The Guardian	4/5 stars
The Independent	3/5 stars
Mojo	4/5 stars
NME	8/10
Pitchfork	7.6/10
Q	3/5 stars
Spin	6/10

Total Life Forever was very well received; many commented how the band's music has matured from their debut album. Review aggregator Metacritic gave the album a normalised rating of 78 out of 100, indicating "generally favourable reviews".

Q magazine's Rupert Howe was more reserved in his praise. Calling it "the schizophrenic second album", Howe opined that "while this album carries more instrumental and emotional heft than its predecessor, something remains off-balance".

Besides being shortlisted for the 2010 Mercury Prize, Total Life Forever brought the band several nominations for the 2011 NME awards, including best album, best track ("Spanish Sahara") and best album artwork.

=== Accolades ===
Publication	Country	Accolade	Year	Rank
Beats per Minute	US	The Top 50 Albums of 2010	2011	43
Clash	UK	Top 40 Albums Of 2010	2010	7
Consequence of Sound	US	The Top 100 Albums of 2010	2010	46
DIY	UK	Albums of the Year	2010	11
Drowned in Sound	UK	Albums of the Year	2010	33
The Line of Best Fit	UK	Albums of 2010	2010	20
Mojo	UK	Top 50 Albums of 2010	2010	25
musicOMH	UK	Top 50 Albums of 2010	2010	8
NME	UK	Top 75 Albums of 2010	2010	6
NME	UK	Greatest Albums of The Decade: The 2010s	2019	19
Q	UK	Top 50 Albums of 2010	2010	16
Sputnikmusic	US	Top 50 Albums of 2010	2011	47

== Track listing ==
All tracks are written by Foals.

No.	Title	Length
1.	"Blue Blood"	5:17
2.	"Miami"	3:42
3.	"Total Life Forever"	3:18
4.	"Black Gold"	6:26
5.	"Spanish Sahara"	6:46
6.	"This Orient"	4:06
7.	"Fugue"	0:49
8.	"After Glow"	6:09
9.	"Alabaster"	4:00
10.	"2 Trees"	5:11
11.	"What Remains"	4:37
Total length:		50:21

Deluxe edition CD 2
No.	Title	Length
1.	"Bloo Blood"	1:00
2.	"Bloo Blood 2"	0:46
3.	"TLF"	0:40
4.	"TLF 2"	1:00
5.	"TLF 3"	1:31
6.	"TLF 4"	1:02
7.	"TLF 5"	1:26
8.	"Black Gold //"	2:53
9.	"Black Gold 2"	8:30
10.	"Spanish Sahara (Sonar)"	1:20
11.	"----"	0:36
12.	"Alabastr"	1:31
13.	"Two Trees"	0:50
14.	"Two Trees 2"	1:37
15.	"Remains"	1:13

iTunes LP bonus tracks
No.	Title	Length
27.	"The Forked Road"	5:37
28.	"Wear & Tear"	4:24
29.	"Spanish Sahara" (Mount Kimbie Remix)	4:00
30.	"Spanish Sahara" (Topher Jones Remix)	7:18
31.	"Spanish Sahara" (Deadboy Remix)	8:58
32.	"Spanish Sahara" (Chad Valley Remix)	3:56
33.	"Spanish Sahara" (John Dahlback Remix)	6:49
34.	"Miami" (MyMy Remix)	6:49
35.	"Miami" (Sacha Funke Remix)	8:23
36.	"Miami" (Tim Fuchs Remix) (featuring Flight Facilities)	6:36
37.	"Miami" (Lissvik Remix)	5:26
38.	"This Orient" (Starkey Remix)	4:42
39.	"This Orient" (Astronomer Remix)	6:24
40.	"Total Life Forever" (iTunes Festival)	5:04
41.	"Miami" (iTunes Festival)	4:00
42.	"Alabaster" (iTunes Festival)	4:49
43.	"Miami" (Glastonbury Acoustic)	3:44
44.	"Spanish Sahara" (6 Music Glastonbury Session)	5:20
45.	"Spanish Sahara" (music video)	6:49
46.	"Miami" (music video)	4:13
47.	"This Orient" (music video)	3:51
48.	"Blue Blood" (music video)	4:50
49.	"Total Life Forever" (making of)	19:00

== Personnel ==
Foals

- Yannis Philippakis – vocals, guitar, drums
- Jack Bevan – drums
- Jimmy Smith – guitar
- Walter Gervers – bass, backing vocals
- Edwin Congreave – keyboard, backing vocals

Additional musicians

- Caroline Wickberg – additional vocals on "Black Gold" and "This Orient"

Technical personnel

- Foals – art direction
- Big Active – artwork
- Foals – artwork
- Tinhead – artwork
- Ferg Peterkin – engineering, programming
- Stephen Marcussen – mastering
- Steve Gullick – photography
- Dave Ma – photography
- Luke Smith – producer
- Mike Crossey – producer, recording assistant on "Blue Blood"
- Daniel Rejmer – engineering on "Spanish Sahara"
- Catherine Marks – engineering, mixing on "Spanish Sahara"
- Alan Moulder – mixing on "Spanish Sahara"

== Charts ==
=== Weekly charts ===
Weekly chart performance for Total Life Forever
Chart (2010–2011)	Peak position
Australian Albums (ARIA)	68
Belgian Albums (Ultratop Flanders)	83
Belgian Albums (Ultratop Wallonia)	72
French Albums (SNEP)	38
German Albums (Offizielle Top 100)	48
Greek Albums (IFPI Greece)	21
Irish Albums (IRMA)	25
Japanese Albums (Oricon)	54
Swiss Albums (Schweizer Hitparade)	62
UK Albums (OCC)	8
US Heatseekers Albums (Billboard)	30

=== Year-end charts ===
Year-end chart performance for Total Life Forever
Chart (2010)	Position
UK Albums (OCC)	194

== Certifications ==
Region	Certification	Certified units/sales
United Kingdom (BPI)	Gold	100,000^{^}
^{^} Shipments figures based on certification alone.
