= Balloons (song) =

Single by Foals

from the album Antidotes
- Released: 10 December 2007
- Genre: Math rock; dance-punk
- Label: Transgressive Records
- Songwriters: Jack Bevan, Edwin Congreave, Walter Gervers, Yannis Philippakis, Jimmy Smith

Foals singles chronology
"Mathletics" (2007)	"Balloons" (2007)	"Cassius" (2008)

Antidotes track listing
- 1. "The French Open"; 2. "Cassius"; 3. "Red Socks Pugie"; 4. "Olympic Airways"; 5. "Electric Bloom"; 6. "Balloons"; 7. "Heavy Water"; 8. "Two Steps, Twice"; 9. "Big Big Love (Fig. 2)"; 10. "Like Swimming"; 11. "Tron"

"Balloons" is the first single from the album Antidotes by Foals. It is their fourth single in total to date. It was released as a digital download on 9 December 2007 and on CD and vinyl the following day.

The video was directed by Dave Ma and features crows, dancers in flapper dresses, a wall of flowers and Foals' artwork maestro Tinhead painting on a wall. Singer Yannis has described the crows as representing coal or fuel.

"Balloons" peaked at number 39 on the UK singles chart, and was voted in at 86 in NME's 100 Tracks of the Decade.

== Track listings ==
Digital download
No.	Title	Length
1.	"Balloons"	3:00

CD single
No.	Title	Length
1.	"Balloons"	3:00
2.	"Brazil Is Here"	4:21

7" single
No.	Title	Length
1.	"Balloons"	3:00
2.	"Dearth"	3:02

12" single
No.	Title	Length
1.	"Balloons" (Kieran Hebden version)	8:41

== Charts ==
Chart (2007)	Peak position
Scotland Singles (OCC)	18
UK Singles (OCC)	39
