= Wake Me Up (Foals song) =

Single by Foals

from the album Life Is Yours
- Released: 4 November 2021
- Genre: Funk rock; new rave; dance-punk
- Length: 4:24
- Label: Warner Bros.
- Songwriter: Foals
- Producers: John Hill; Miles James; A. K. Paul

Foals singles chronology
"Neptune" (2020)	"Wake Me Up" (2021)	"2am" (2022)

Music video
- "Wake Me Up" on YouTube

Remix cover
- Flight Facilities remix cover

"Wake Me Up" is a song by British rock band Foals. It was released as the lead single from their seventh studio album, Life Is Yours, on 4 November 2021.

== Background and recording ==
In an interview with Triple J, guitarist Jimmy Smith said the writing and concept of the song, predates the Everything Not Saved Will Be Lost sessions, although it was formally put together during the winter of 2020–21. The completion of the song, lyrically, took place during the first major wave of the COVID-19 pandemic in the United Kingdom. The concept of writing the song was during lockdowns during the pandemic, and the band's imagining of a return to normalcy. In an interview with Consequence of Sound, lead vocalist Yannis Philippakis, said "we were kind of imagining things returning to normality and the reemergence of almost like a cartoon spring after this incredibly bleak period. And that informed all the music we were writing at that time, almost wishing the summer to arrive and wishing for things to get better, and for people to be able to get back together again."

Recorded during the Summer 2021, the single was produced by John Hill, while there was additional co-production by Miles James and A. K. Paul.

== Music and lyrics ==
"Wake Me Up" has been described by contemporary music journalists as a new rave song with a funk rock bassline. In an interview with New Musical Express, lead singer, Yannis Philippakis, described the song as an "antithesis" to lockdown blues in relation to the COVID-19 pandemic. Philippakis described, while writing the song that "it was almost like wishful thinking that we’d ever come out; that there would be a world to return to. At certain points it felt unremittingly bleak". When interviewed by Consequence of Sound, Philippakis said that "we wanted to create a contrast between the outside world and the music that we’re writing inside this small room. We couldn’t help but reimagine ourselves on stage and how euphoric it will be once it returns."

The song is performed in a drop D tuning and played in D minor and C major key. It is performed in a 4/4 time signature at a tempo of 120 beats per minute.

== Release and reception ==
"Wake Me Up" was released worldwide on 4 November 2021 as a 7-inch (18 cm) single, digital download, and as streaming media. In an interview with Triple J, the band decided to release "Wake Me Up" as the lead single because they believed it had a positive, upbeat theme. Specifically, the band said that the song "felt like the best song to put out first because it’s got a party vibe to it, and I feel like everyone could do with a good party now."

== Live performances ==
The song was originally under the working title of "Novo" and premiered during the band's performance at Cardiff Castle on 12 August 2021.

== Remixes ==
Three remixes of "Wake Me Up" were released. On 10 December 2021, the Gaspard Augé & Victor Le Manse Remix was released. On 14 January 2022, Australian electronic duo, Flight Facilities, released a remix of the song. On 28 January 2022, Lawrence Hart released a remix of "Wake Me Up".

== Credits and personnel ==
The following individuals were crediting with the writing, composing, and production of the song:

Foals

- Jack Bevan — composer, drums, percussion
- Yannis Philippakis — bass, composer, guitar, vocals
- Jimmy Smith – composer, guitar, keyboard

Production

- Rob Cohen, Pete Hutchings, Oli Middleton, and Christoph Skirl — recording engineer
- Scott Desmarais, Robin Florent, Chris Galland, Jeremie Inhaber, and Manny Marroquin — mixing engineer
- Jack Freeman and Kit Monteith — background vocals
- John Hill, and A.K. Paul — producer
- Miles James — associate producer
- Randy Merrill — mastering

== Charts ==
=== Weekly charts ===
Chart (2021–2022)	Peak position
Billboard Mexico Ingles Airplay	24
UK Singles (Official Charts)	98
US Adult Alternative Airplay (Billboard)	6
US Alternative Airplay (Billboard)	12
US Rock & Alternative Airplay (Billboard)	21

=== Year-end charts ===
Chart (2022)	Position
US Adult Alternative Airplay Songs (Billboard)	38
US Alternative Airplay Songs (Billboard)	43

== Release history ==
Release dates and formats for "Wake Me Up"
Region	Date	Format(s)	Label(s)	Ref.
United States	November 8, 2021	Adult alternative radio	ADA • Q Prime	
United States	November 9, 2021	Alternative radio	ADA • Q Prime	
