= Hummer (Foals song) =

Single by Foals
- B-side: "Astronauts and All"
- Released: 12 March 2007
- Genre: Math rock; dance-punk
- Length: 2:57
- Label: Transgressive
- Songwriters: Jack Bevan, Edwin Congreave, Walter Gervers, Yannis Philippakis, Jimmy Smith
- Producer: Gareth Parton

Foals singles chronology
"Try This on Your Piano/Look at My Furrows of Worry" (2006)	"Hummer" (2007)	"Mathletics" (2007)

"Hummer" is the second single by Foals and is the first single with Yannis Philippakis on lead vocals (the previous lead vocalist was Andrew Mears). It was released on 12 March 2007. It was recorded and mixed by producer Gareth Parton at the Fortress and Metropolis recording studios, London. It was released as a digital download and on vinyl on 23 April 2007.

Although initially released as a non-album single, it was added as a bonus track to later editions of Foals' first album Antidotes.

The song was used in the second series of Skins.

== Critical reception ==
In an 8/10 review, Drowned In Sound described the track as sounding "like Animal Collective rifling through The Rapture’s audio files on electro night". It came 12th in a top tracks of 2007 list compiled by NME. In October 2011, NME placed it at number 142 on its list of "150 Best Tracks of the Past 15 Years".

== Track listing ==
7" single
No.	Title	Length
1.	"Hummer"	2:56
2.	"Astronauts and All"	3:11

Digital download
No.	Title	Length
1.	"Hummer"	2:56

Promo CD
No.	Title	Length
1.	"Hummer"	2:56
2.	"Astronauts and All"	3:11

== Charts ==
Chart (2007)	Peak position
UK Singles Chart (Official Charts Company)	167
