= Mathletics (Foals song) =

Single by Foals
- B-side: "Big Big Love (Fig #1)"
- Released: 20 August 2007
- Genre: Math rock, dance-punk
- Label: Transgressive Records
- Songwriters: Jack Bevan, Edwin Congreave, Walter Gervers, Yannis Philippakis, Jimmy Smith
- Producer: Gareth Parton

Foals singles chronology
"Hummer" (2007)	"Mathletics" (2007)	"Balloons" (2008)

"Mathletics" is the third single by Foals. It peaked at number 109 on the UK singles chart. It was released as a digital download and on vinyl on 20 August 2007. It was recorded and mixed by producer Gareth Parton at the Fortress and Strongroom recording studios. The song was used in promotional advertisements on the UK channel Fiver. The track received generally positive reviews.

Although initially released as a non-album single, it was added as a bonus track to later editions of Foals's debut album, Antidotes.

== Track listing ==
7" single
No.	Title	Length
1.	"Mathletics"	3:10
2.	"Big Big Love (Fig #1)"	4:39

Promo CD
No.	Title	Length
1.	"Mathletics"	3:10
2.	"Big Big Love (Fig #1)"	4:39

== Charts ==
Chart (2007)	Peak position
Scotland Singles (OCC)	55
UK Singles Chart (Official Charts Company)	109
