= Life Is Yours =

Studio album by Foals
- Released: 17 June 2022
- Studio: Speedy Wunderground, London; Real World, Bath
- Genre: Dance-rock; disco
- Length: 41:55
- Label: Warner; Transgressive; ADA
- Producer: A. K. Paul; Dan Carey; John Hill

Foals chronology
Everything Not Saved Will Be Lost – Part 2 (2019)	Life Is Yours (2022)

Singles from Life Is Yours
- 1. "Wake Me Up" Released: 4 November 2021; 2. "2am" Released: 10 February 2022; 3. "Looking High" Released: 1 April 2022; 4. "2001" Released: 19 May 2022; 5. "Crest of the Wave" Released: 14 June 2022

Alternative cover
- "Life Is Dub"

Life Is Yours is the seventh studio album by British rock band Foals, released on 17 June 2022 via Warner/Transgressive/ADA. The album was preceded by five singles; "Wake Me Up", "2am", "Looking High", "2001" and "Crest of the Wave".

Life Is Yours is the group's first album as a trio, following the departures of keyboardist Edwin Congreave in 2021 and bassist Walter Gervers in 2018 (though Gervers later returned in 2023). The album is also notable as the group's first time collaborating with multiple producers for a release, which includes John Hill, Dan Carey, A. K. Paul and Miles James.

In December 2022, frontman Yannis Philippakis spoke to NME about a remix of the album by Dan Carey called Life Is Dub. Philippakis stated "I think he just loaded the album up on some decks, took some mushrooms and took the album into space!".

Life Is Dub was exclusively released on 22 April 2023 as a limited edition vinyl to select records stores globally in participation with Record Store Day 2023.

== Promotion ==
On 27 October 2021, the band teased a promotional clip of an iPhone snooze alarm, revealing the release date of the album's first single, "Wake Me Up" to be released 4 November 2021.

On 10 February 2022, Foals released "2am" and announced the name of their seventh album as Life Is Yours, and later announced the album release date.

On 1 April 2022, the band released the third single from the album, "Looking High".

On 19 May 2022, Foals released the single "2001". Three days before Life Is Yours was released, the band released the fifth and final single from the album, "Crest of the Wave"

=== Tour ===
In April 2022, Foals embarked on their Life Is Yours Tour in support of the album. Goat Girl, Shame, Yard Act, and Egyptian Blue supported the band on select UK dates.

=== Life Is Dub ===
A dub version of the album (entirely reimagined and remixed by Carey), titled Life Is Dub was initially released on 22 April 2023 as an exclusive limited edition 12" gold vinyl, in lieu of Record Store Day 2023, then digitally on 19 May 2023. The release was preceded by remixed singles, 2am (Dan Carey Dub) and Life Is Yours (Dan Carey Dub) on 24 March and 21 April 2023 respectively.

== Critical reception ==
Professional ratings
Aggregate scores
Source	Rating
Metacritic	74/100
Review scores
Source	Rating
The Guardian	3/5 stars
NME	4/5 stars
Pitchfork	5.5/10
Rolling Stone	4/5 stars

Life Is Yours has an average rating of 74 out of 100 on review aggregator website Metacritic and an AnyDecentMusic? score of 7.5 out of 10. Andrew Trendell of NME praised the album's production, and wrote the lead single "Wake Me Up" "delivers that same spirit like a spicy tequila shot – all funk, fury and fire-breathing defiance as an ode to getting away and losing your shit". Phil Mongredien of The Guardian stated that the album's use of keyboards of synths was a "bold move, and probably a smart one", whilst criticising the second half of the album, describing "Crest of the Wave" as an "ersatz Everything Everything". Lee Campbell of Rolling Stone described the feel of the album as "certainly more joyous and celebratory [than Everything Not Saved Will Be Lost – Part 2]".

== Track listing ==
All tracks are written by Yannis Philippakis, Jack Bevan, and Jimmy Smith.

Life Is Yours track listing
No.	Title	Producer(s)	Length
1.	"Life Is Yours"	John Hill; Miles James^{[c]}	4:12
2.	"Wake Me Up"	Hill; A. K. Paul^{[a]}; James^{[c]}	4:23
3.	"2AM"	Hill; Dan Carey	3:44
4.	"2001"	Hill; Paul; James^{[c]}	4:27
5.	"(Summer Sky)"	Hill; Paul; James^{[c]}	0:36
6.	"Flutter"	Hill; Carey	3:35
7.	"Looking High"	Hill; Paul^{[a]}; James^{[c]}	4:21
8.	"Under the Radar"	Hill; Carey	2:59
9.	"Crest of the Wave"	Hill; Carey; James^{[a]}; Jono Ma^{[a]}	3:46
10.	"The Sound"	Hill; Carey	4:25
11.	"Wild Green"	Hill; Carey	5:27
Total length:			41:55

D2C bonus etched demo 12" vinyl
No.	Title	Length
1.	"LIY Room" (Rehearsal Room Recording)	2:08
2.	"WMU July 22" (Yannis Logic Demo)	2:37
3.	"2AM 20 July" (Yannis Logic Demo)	3:01
4.	"2001 Vibes" (123 Studios, Recorded by Brett Shaw)	2:35
5.	"LH MJ Rough Demo" (Demo Recording, Konk Studios)	4:20
6.	"UTR Room" (Rehearsal Room Recording)	3:10
7.	"Issak Rough Demo" (Recorded by Jojo Ma at 301 Studios)	5:51
Total length:		23:32

Notes

- ^{^[a]} indicates an additional producer
- ^{^[c]} indicates a co-producer

== Personnel ==
Foals

- Yannis Philippakis – vocals, guitar, bass
- Jack Bevan – drums, percussion
- Jimmy Smith – guitar, keyboards

Additional musicians

- Jack Freeman – backing vocals (track 2)
- Kit Monteith – backing vocals (track 2)
- A. K. Paul – bass, additional keyboards (track 4, 5)

Technical

- Matt Colton – mastering (track 1, 3–11)
- Randy Merrill – mastering (track 2)
- Manny Marroquin – mixing (track 1–5, 7, 9)
- Mark "Spike" Stent – mixing (track 6, 8, 10)
- Chris Laws – mixing (track 6, 8, 10)
- Chris Galland – mix engineering (track 1–5, 7, 9)
- Rob Cohen – engineering
- Christoph Skirl – engineering
- Oli Middleton – engineering
- Pete Hutchings – engineering
- Alexis Smith – engineering (track 3, 6, 8–11)
- Mark Rankin – additional engineering (track 1, 3–11)
- James Keeley – additional engineering (track 3, 6–8, 10)
- Jeremie Inhaber – mixing assistance (track 1–5, 7, 9)
- Robin Florent – mixing assistance (track 1–5, 7, 9)
- Scott Desmarais – mixing assistance (track 1–5, 7, 9)
- Charlie Holmes – mixing assistance (track 6, 8, 10)
- Kieran Beardmore – mixing assistance (track 6, 8, 10)
- Matt Wolach – mixing assistance (track 6, 8, 10)

== Charts ==
Chart performance for Life Is Yours
Chart (2022)	Peak position
Australian Albums (ARIA)	13
Austrian Albums (Ö3 Austria)	47
Belgian Albums (Ultratop Flanders)	61
Belgian Albums (Ultratop Wallonia)	41
Dutch Albums (Album Top 100)	34
French Albums (SNEP)	42
German Albums (Offizielle Top 100)	13
Hungarian Albums (MAHASZ)	11
Irish Albums (OCC)	15
Japanese Albums (Oricon)	96
New Zealand Albums (RMNZ)	35
Portuguese Albums (AFP)	35
Scottish Albums (OCC)	1
Spanish Albums (PROMUSICAE)	74
Swiss Albums (Schweizer Hitparade)	10
UK Albums (OCC)	3
