= Antidotes (album) =

Studio album by Foals
- Released: 24 March 2008
- Recorded: Summer 2007
- Studio: Stay Gold (Brooklyn, New York)
- Genre: Indie rock; dance-punk; post-punk revival; math rock
- Length: 46:49
- Label: Transgressive; Sub Pop
- Producer: Foals; Dave Sitek

Foals chronology
Antidotes (2008)	Total Life Forever (2010)

Singles from Antidotes
- 1. "Balloons" Released: 10 December 2007; 2. "Cassius" Released: 10 March 2008; 3. "Red Socks Pugie" Released: 9 June 2008; 4. "Olympic Airways" Released: 6 October 2008

Antidotes is the debut studio album by British indie rock band Foals. It was released on 24 March 2008 in the United Kingdom on Transgressive Records, and on 8 April 2008 in the United States through Sub Pop.

The album's themes are varied and cryptic, but are generally melancholic and focused on relationships. They are exemplified by the four singles: "Balloons", "Cassius", "Red Socks Pugie", and "Olympic Airways".

== Recording ==
The album was recorded in Stay Gold Studios Brooklyn in summer 2007, and was produced by TV on the Radio's Dave Sitek. However, Foals remixed Antidotes in London, complaining that he made it sound like it was "recorded in the Grand Canyon."

However, in an interview with MusFlashTV, Foals' drummer Jack Bevan said, "Our producer, David Sitek was great because he didn't interfere in the actual recording progress. We kind of engineered it so that we would get the tracks down, get all of the sort of essential parts down and then, halfway through the recording he kind of came in, and when we were doing overdubs and that kind of thing, he sort of started to assist us with making it sort of fill out." Yannis added "All the sounds were there, and he added a depth. He messed with the spaces around the sounds so there's this weird ambience on all the tracks."

The tracking of the parts was unorthodox in many ways ranging from drums recorded in alleyways on cassette tape recorders and then reprocessed through outboard gear to vocals being sung while moving round the room and brass performed by members of Antibalas Afrobeat Orchestra directed to not play directly into the microphones.

== Reception ==
Professional ratings
Aggregate scores
Source	Rating
Metacritic	74/100
Review scores
Source	Rating
AllMusic	4/5 stars
Drowned in Sound	9/10
Gigwise	4.5/5 stars
The Guardian	3/5 stars
NME	7/10
The Observer	4/5 stars
Pitchfork	5.9/10
Rolling Stone	3.5/5 stars
The Times	4/5 stars
Uncut	4/5 stars

It peaked at number three in the UK Albums Chart. In the US, it reached a high of number 28 on the Top Heatseekers chart, but failed to chart on the Billboard 200.

According to Metacritic, the album received "generally favourable reviews" from critics.

== Track listing ==
No.	Title	Length
1.	"The French Open"	3:45
2.	"Cassius"	3:50
3.	"Red Socks Pugie"	5:15
4.	"Olympic Airways"	4:12
5.	"Electric Bloom"	4:56
6.	"Balloons"	3:00
7.	"Heavy Water"	4:32
8.	"Two Steps, Twice"	4:41
9.	"Big Big Love (Fig. 2)"	5:45
10.	"Like Swimming"	2:01
11.	"Tron"	4:53

US bonus tracks
No.	Title	Length
12.	"Hummer"	2:56
13.	"Mathletics"	3:09

Apple Music bonus tracks
No.	Title	Length
14.	"Dearth"	3:02
15.	"Titan Arum"	5:09
16.	"Gold Gold Gold"	5:48
17.	"Glaciers"	7:46
18.	"Astronauts and All"	3:10
19.	"Big Big Love (Fig. 1)"	4:39
20.	"Brazil Is Here"	4:21

Japanese bonus tracks
No.	Title	Length
12.	"Mathletics"	3:09
13.	"Hummer"	2:56
14.	"Brazil Is Here"	4:21
15.	"Cassius" (music video)
16.	"Balloons" (music video)

Spotify bonus tracks
No.	Title	Length
12.	"Brazil Is Here"	4:22
13.	"Dearth"	3:02

Tour edition bonus tracks
No.	Title	Length
12.	"Titan Arum"	5:12
13.	"Gold Gold Gold"	5:50
14.	"Mathletics"	3:09
15.	"Hummer"	2:56

UK special edition bonus disc
No.	Title	Length
1.	"Hummer"	2:59
2.	"Astronauts and All"	3:11
3.	"Mathletics"	3:11
4.	"Big Big Love (Fig. 1)"	4:41
5.	"XXXXX" (live at Liars Club, Nottingham, Feb 10th 2007)	1:56
6.	"The French Open" (live at Liars Club, Nottingham, Feb 10th 2007)	3:00
7.	"Balloons" (live at Liars Club, Nottingham, Feb 10th 2007)	3:01
8.	"Two Steps, Twice" (live at Liars Club, Nottingham, Feb 10th 2007)	4:32
9.	"Mathletics" (live at Liars Club, Nottingham, Feb 10th 2007)	3:21

== Chart positions ==
Country	Peak position	Certification	Sales
United Kingdom	#3	Gold	25,292 (first week)
Japan	#80		2,521 (first week)
France	#84		
The Netherlands	#99		
New Zealand	#99		
U.S. Top Heatseekers	#28		

== Personnel ==
Foals

- Yannis Philippakis – vocals, guitar, drums
- Jack Bevan – drums
- Jimmy Smith – guitar
- Walter Gervers – bass, backing vocals
- Edwin Congreave – keyboard, backing vocals

Additional musicians

- Stuart Bogie – saxophone
- Aaron Johnson – trombone
- Eric Biondo – trumpet

Technical personnel

- Tinhead – artwork
- Alan Labiner – engineering
- Chris Coady – engineering
- John Valencia – engineering
- Guy Davie – mastering
- Mike Crossey – mixing
- David Andrew Sitek – producer
- L. Hris Moore – recording assistant
