= Red Socks Pugie =

Single by Foals

from the album Antidotes
- Released: 9 June 2008
- Genre: Math rock, post-rock
- Length: 5:19
- Label: Transgressive Records
- Songwriter(s): Jack Bevan, Edwin Congreave, Walter Gervers, Yannis Philippakis, Jimmy Smith

Foals singles chronology
| "Cassius" (2007) | "Red Socks Pugie" (2008) | "Olympic Airways" (2008) |

Antidotes track listing
- 1. "The French Open"; 2. "Cassius"; 3. "Red Socks Pugie"; 4. "Olympic Airways"; 5. "Electric Bloom"; 6. "Balloons"; 7. "Heavy Water"; 8. "Two Steps, Twice"; 9. "Big Big Love (Fig. 2)"; 10. "Like Swimming"; 11. "Tron"

"Red Socks Pugie" is the third single from the album Antidotes by Foals. It is their sixth single in total to date. It was released as a digital download, CD and vinyl on 9 June 2008.

Lead singer Yannis Philippakis stated that the track was about "the amazing energy, the flows you feel when you're in love, or you think you are".

The video was directed by Dave Ma and features footage of the band near a lake, nuclear weapon test explosions and medical animations.

"Red Socks Pugie" peaked at number 89 on the UK Singles Chart. The song was used by ITV during their coverage of the FA Cup during the 2009-10 football season.

== Formats and track listings ==
Digital download
| No. | Title | Length |
|---|---|---|
| 1. | "Red Socks Pugie" | 5:15 |

Digital EP
| No. | Title | Length |
|---|---|---|
| 1. | "Red Socks Pugie" | 5:15 |
| 2. | "Red Socks Pugie" (Henrik Schwarz remix) | 7:07 |
| 3. | "Red Socks Pugie" (Various Productions remix) | 4:18 |

CD single
| No. | Title | Length |
|---|---|---|
| 1. | "Red Socks Pugie" | 3:50 |
| 2. | "A Sketch for ESG" | 5:29 |

7" single
| No. | Title | Length |
|---|---|---|
| 1. | "Red Socks Pugie" | 3:50 |
| 2. | "Titan Arum" | 5:12 |

7" single
| No. | Title | Length |
|---|---|---|
| 1. | "Red Socks Pugie" | 3:50 |
| 2. | "Gold Gold Gold" | 5:50 |

== Charts ==
| Chart (2008) | Peak position |
|---|---|
| Scotland (OCC) | 27 |
| UK Singles (OCC) | 89 |
