= Olympic Airways (Foals song) =

Single by Foals

from the album Antidotes
- Released: 6 October 2008
- Genre: Math rock; post-rock; dance-punk
- Length: 4:18
- Label: Transgressive Records; Sub Pop Records
- Songwriters: Yannis Philippakis, Jack Bevan, Jimmy Smith, Walter Gervers and Edwin Congreave

Foals singles chronology
"Red Socks Pugie" (2008)	"Olympic Airways" (2008)	"Spanish Sahara" (2010)

Antidotes track listing
- 1. "The French Open"; 2. "Cassius"; 3. "Red Socks Pugie"; 4. "Olympic Airways"; 5. "Electric Bloom"; 6. "Balloons"; 7. "Heavy Water"; 8. "Two Steps, Twice"; 9. "Big Big Love (Fig. 2)"; 10. "Like Swimming"; 11. "Tron"

"Olympic Airways" is the fourth and last single from the album Antidotes by Foals. It was released as a digital download, CD and vinyl on 6 October 2008.

Yannis Philippakis stated that the lyrics are about or at least in connection with London Heathrow Airport. In an interview with NME, Philippakis stated that the song was about feelings of isolation, just wanting to be at home, and not wanting to go outside.

The video was directed by Dave Ma and features friends, crude oil, balloons and an octopus.

"Olympic Airways" was featured on the FIFA 09 soundtrack and on Forza Horizon 6 on the in-game Sub Pop Records station.

== Formats and track listings ==
Digital download
No.	Title	Length
1.	"Olympic Airways"	4:12

CD single
No.	Title	Length
1.	"Olympic Airways"	4:12
2.	"Glaciers"	7:47

7" single
No.	Title	Length
1.	"Olympic Airways"	4:12
2.	"Unthink This"	5:02

== Charts ==
Chart (2008)	Peak position
Scotland Singles (OCC)	20
UK Singles Chart (Official Charts Company)	160
UK Indie (OCC)	20
