= GrapeFestival =

Slovak open-air festival

Grape Festival
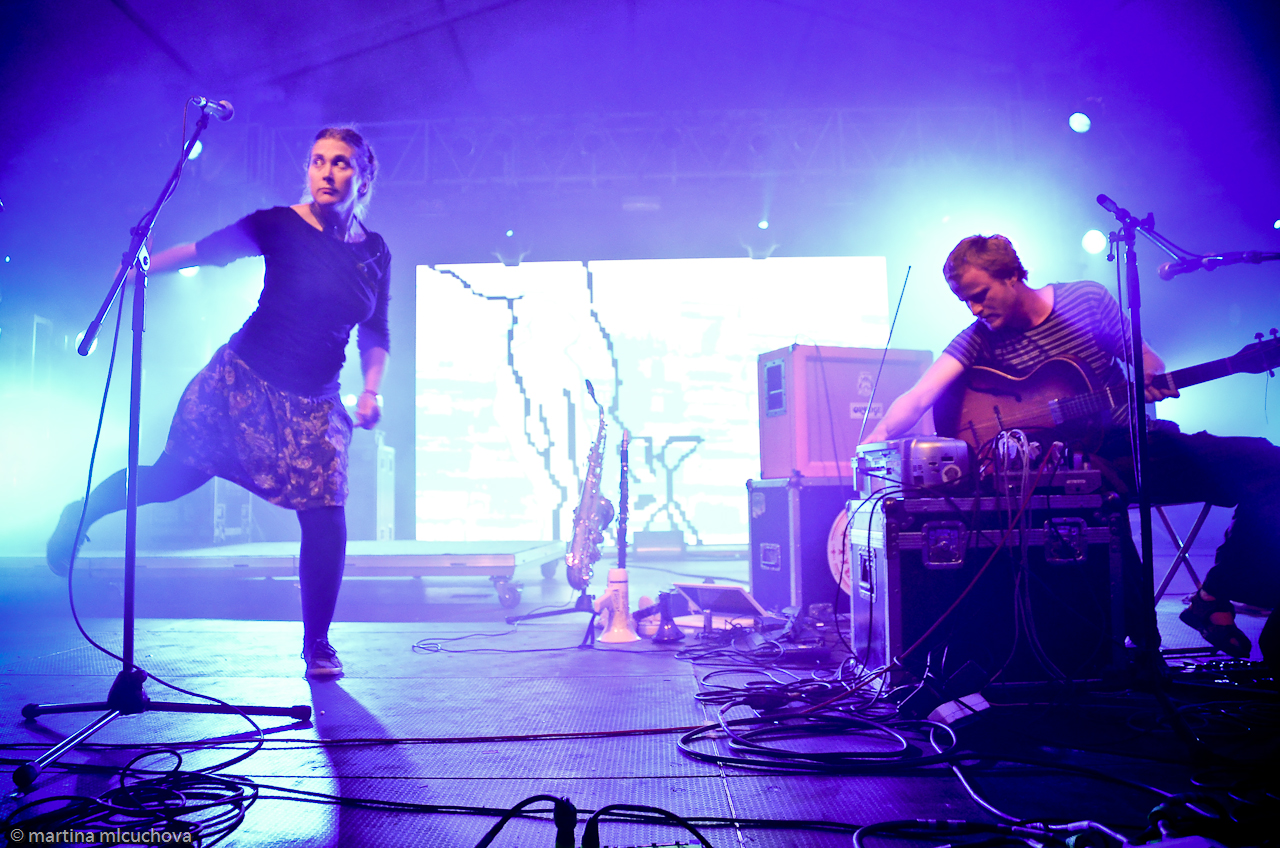
- Genre: Various
- Dates: First half of August (2 days)
- Locations: Piešťany, Slovakia: Piešťany Airport (2010–2019); Trenčín, Slovakia: Trenčín Airport (2022–present)
- Years active: 2010–present
- Website: Official website

Grape Festival is an open-air summer music festival in Slovakia, first organized in 2010. The festival was planned by a group of friends to happen in Pezinok, a town known for its wine production. It was from this local history that the name Grape Festival came from. However the plans changed and the festival site was moved to the Trenčín Airport.

The festival features alternative music, rock, pop, dance music, world music, house, techno, drum and bass, hip hop.

== See also ==
- List of electronic music festivals
