= Trophy Wife (English band) =

English indie rock band

- Origin: Oxford, England
- Genres: Indie rock; disco
- Years active: 2010–2013
- Label: Moshi Moshi Records
- Spinoff of: Jonquil
- Members: Jody Prewett; Ben Rimmer; Kit Monteith

Trophy Wife were an English indie rock band from Oxford, England, consisting of Jody Prewett (vocals, guitar, bass), Ben Rimmer (keyboards, sampler) and Kit Monteith (drums, percussion, sampler). The band disbanded after playing their last show at the O2 Academy, Oxford, on 14 June 2013.

== History ==
=== Founding ===
The three were all formerly members of fellow Oxford band Jonquil. They describe their sound on their Facebook page as "pentatonic pop". When asked in a 2010 interview with UK music blog There Goes the Fear about the origin of their name, they responded, "We’ve had the name for a while and it seemed to suit the sounds we started making. To us, it’s a name that is both glamorous and glitzy yet somehow inherently dark. In many ways this is also how we see our music; Kit had heaps of old manual photographs of these desolate, windswept English locations and we pasted the words ‘Trophy Wife’ in big pink letters onto them and we really liked the relationship between the two."

=== Releases ===
After releasing their acclaimed debut single "Microlite" on 8 November 2010 on Moshi Moshi Records, the band played their first live shows, which included a string of successful support slots with the likes of Foals and Bombay Bicycle Club. The follow-up double A-side single to "Microlite" was "The Quiet Earth" / "White Horses", released on 28 February 2011.

Trophy Wife describes their music as "ambitionless office disco". They clarified this genre to There Goes the Fear further: "Most descriptions of bands are often misplaced or too generic. We wanted to connect ourselves to something that is specific to us so we came up with our own term to describe our music. We also came up with commuter pop and pentatonic disco." Paul Lester of The Guardian described their debut single "Microlite" like this: It exudes melancholy even as the beat fires up; it's our old friend, sad disco, something to dance to even as you ponder the vapidity and meaninglessness of frivolous self-expression.

Trophy Wife are part of the Blessing Force movement currently active in the Oxford area. The band's sound and aesthetic is informed by influences as diverse as Hank Marvin, The Notwist, Studio, Tortoise, Ennio Morricone, PJ Harvey, Polmo Polpo, Fleetwood Mac, The Shadows, Glissandro 70, Caribou, and Donna Summer. These influences can not only be heard in the band's music and production but are also echoed in their artwork, photography and videos – all facets of which the three band members contribute to equally.

Trophy Wife were the main support for Esben and the Witch's early 2011 tour and were chosen to play an HMV Next Big Thing show on 10 February 2011 alongside James Yuill, CocknBullKid, and Visions of Trees. The band went on a headline tour of the UK in November 2011, following the release of their Bruxism EP on 17 October 2011. All five tracks on the EP were inspired by the sleeping disorders suffered by their band members. Each song is unique in that each had their own producer(s). The band co-produced early previewed track "Canopy Shade" with Plaid, the title track "Bruxism" with James Yuill, and "Seven Waves" with Andrew Halford and Aidan Laverty. "Sleepwalks" was produced by Ewan Pearson (Tracey Thorn, Delphic), and "Wolf" was produced by friend and Foals band leader Yannis Philippakis.

As revealed in a news story on One for the People on 9 August 2012, Trophy Wife's debut album is almost completed and the band will be releasing previews of its songs (11 in total) visually in collage format on their official Tumblr.

=== Disbandment ===
On 20 May 2013, the band posted a statement on Facebook releasing their first full-length album and also their plans to split up saying they were "putting Trophy Wife to rest." That also released details for a group of farewell shows.

== Discography ==
=== Albums ===
Trophy Wife

- Released: 20 May 2013
- Label: Moshi Moshi Records
- Tracks:
  - 1. Absence
  - 2. Glue
  - 3. What You Gave Away
  - 4. Like No Other
  - 5. Surfacing
  - 6. Antipodea
  - 7. Microlite
  - 8. Heavy Touch
  - 9. High Windows
  - 10. Always Falling Away
  - 11. Hold On

=== Singles ===
"Microlite"

- Released: 8 November 2010
- Label: Moshi Moshi Records
- Tracks:
  - A - Microlite
  - B - Take This Night

"The Quiet Earth / White Horses"

- Released: 28 February 2011
- Label: Moshi Moshi Records
- Tracks:
  - A - The Quiet Earth
  - B - White Horses

=== EPs ===
Bruxism EP

- Released: 17 October 2011
- Label: Blessing Force
- Tracks:
  1. Canopy Shade
  2. Bruxism
  3. Seven Waves
  4. Sleepwalks
  5. Wolf
