= Spanish Sahara (song) =

Single by Foals

Single by Foals

from the album Total Life Forever
- Released: 17 April 2010
- Studio: Svenska Grammofon (Gothenburg, Sweden)
- Genre: Progressive rock; post-rock
- Length: 6:35
- Label: Transgressive; Sub Pop
- Songwriters: Jack Bevan; Edwin Congreave; Walter Gervers; Yannis Philippakis; Jimmy Smith
- Producer: Luke Smith

Foals singles chronology
"Olympic Airways" (2008)	"Spanish Sahara" (2010)	"This Orient" (2010)

"Spanish Sahara" is a song by British indie rock band Foals. Although not an official single, it was the first song to be released from the band's second album, Total Life Forever. It was premiered on 1 March 2010, on BBC Radio 1. Later that night, a music video for the single was put up on the Foals' website. On 6 March, when the Total Life Forever site went up, Foals premiered instrument samplings of the tracks that would be on Total Life Forever in the track listing order. The fifth sample was a synthesizer sample of "Spanish Sahara".

The single was released on 17 April only as a 7", to celebrate Record Store Day. Only 1000 copies were printed and sold through independent record stores. The remix of the song by Mount Kimbie was later available as a free MP3 given to members of the Foals website.

== Recording and meaning ==
Yannis Philippakis once stated that it was probably the first song to be completed of the album.

Regarding the meaning of the song, Philippakis said:

It has no real relevance to the real Spanish Sahara, which none of us have been to. It's kind of an imaginary place—somewhere that's quite nightmarish and ravaged. It's like a desolate landscape and the whole song is like, getting over a trauma, but the trauma doesn't go away and it multiplies from one into a bunch of furies, which was kinda to do with the Greek myths of the furies, who would haunt families and generations.

== Reception and success ==
"Spanish Sahara" peaked at number 148 on the UK Singles Chart.

The song was number one in the NME top 25 songs of the year 2010. In February 2011, it won the award for 'Best Song' at the NME Awards. In October 2011, NME eventually placed it at number 14 on its list "150 Best Tracks of the Past 15 Years". In January 2011, the song was voted Number 98 on the Triple J Hottest 100 for 2010.

The song was used in a promotional trailer for season 7 of the HBO TV show Entourage, in a series 2 episode of Misfits and on episode 2 of TV show Lovesick. The song is also heard in the movie It's Only the End of the World by Xavier Dolan, as well as the 2015 video game Life is Strange.

== Music video ==
The music video, directed by Dave Ma, is intended to represent internal horror and fury. It features lead singer Yannis Philippakis dragging an animal carcass up a hillside in Scotland and later burning it. According to Philippakis, the location they chose was similar to the ravaged place he had in mind when writing the song.

== Track listings ==
7-inch single
No.	Title	Length
1.	"Spanish Sahara"	6:35
2.	"Spanish Sahara" (Mount Kimbie Remix)	4:05

Spanish Sahara (with London Contemporary Orchestra)
No.	Title	Length
1.	"Spanish Sahara" (with London Contemporary Orchestra)	3:38

== Charts ==
Chart (2010)	Peak position
UK Singles Chart (Official Charts Company)	123

== Certifications ==
Region	Certification	Certified units/sales
United Kingdom (BPI)	Silver	200,000^{‡}
^{‡} Sales+streaming figures based on certification alone.
