= Foals (band) =

British indie rock band

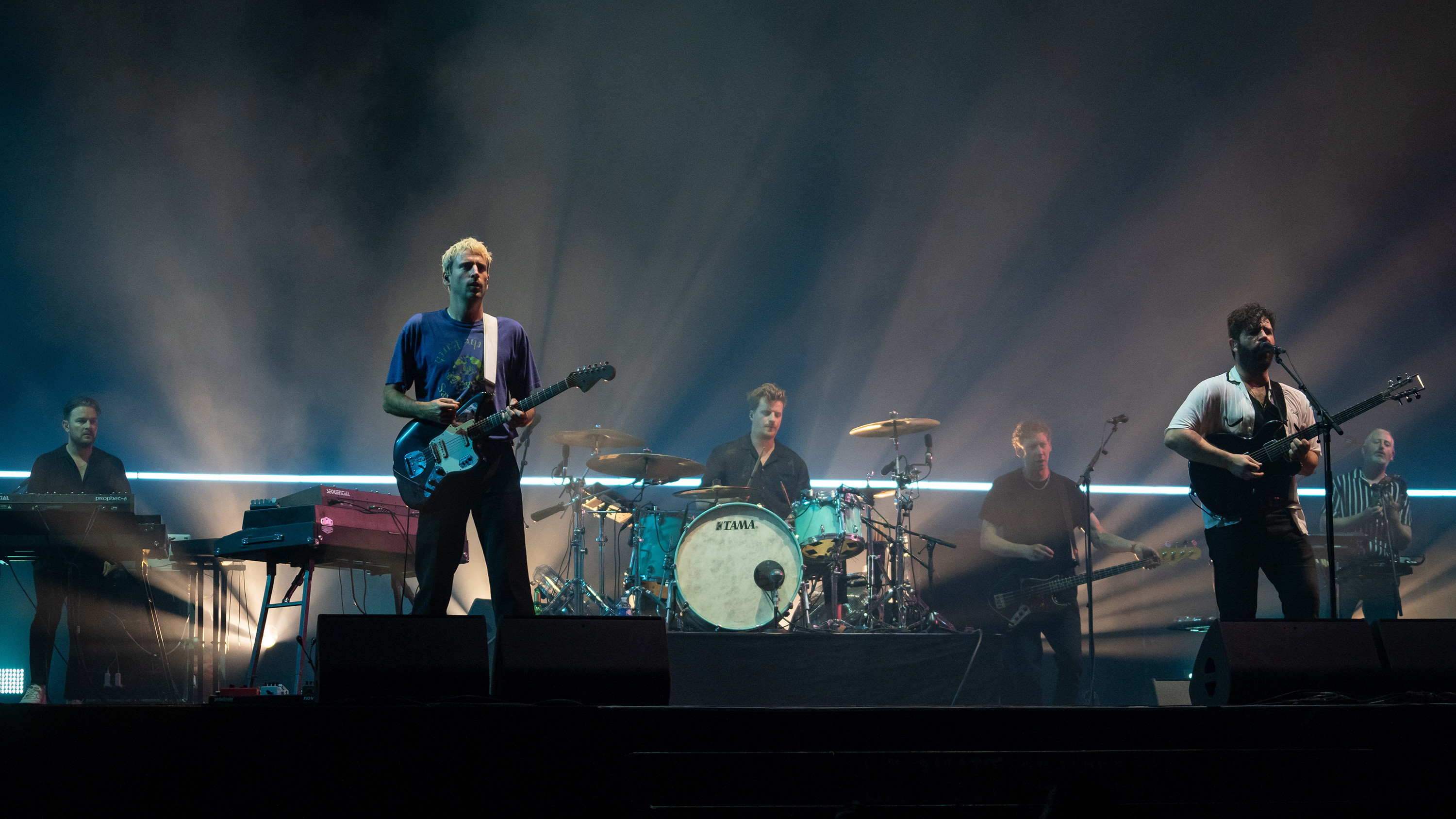
- Foals performing in 2023

Background information
- Origin: Oxford, England
- Genres: Indie rock; alternative rock; math rock; art rock; dance-punk
- Works: Foals discography
- Years active: 2005–present
- Labels: Transgressive; Sub Pop; Warner
- Members: Yannis Philippakis; Jack Bevan; Jimmy Smith; Walter Gervers
- Past members: Andrew Mears; Edwin Congreave
- Website: foals.co.uk

Foals are a British rock band formed in Oxford in 2005. The band's current line-up consists of Greek-born lead vocalist and guitarist Yannis Philippakis, drummer and percussionist Jack Bevan, guitarist and keyboardist Jimmy Smith, and bassist Walter Gervers.

Foals are currently signed to Warner Records, and have released seven studio albums to date: Antidotes (2008), Total Life Forever (2010), Holy Fire (2013), What Went Down (2015), Everything Not Saved Will Be Lost – Part 1 and Part 2 (2019), with the latter becoming the group's first album to top the UK Albums Chart, and their most recent, Life Is Yours (2022). They have also released one video album, six extended plays and 35 singles.

Foals have toured internationally for over a decade and have featured at many festivals including Glastonbury, Coachella, and Roskilde. They have won a number of awards, including best live act at the 2013 Q Awards, while producers Alan Moulder and Flood were awarded 'UK Producer of the Year' for their work on the album Holy Fire.

== History ==
=== 2005–2006: Formation ===
The lead singer of the band Youthmovies, Andrew Mears, originally formed the band Foals. He was present on the band's debut 7" single, "Try This on Your Piano/Look at My Furrows of Worry", but left shortly afterwards to concentrate on Youthmovies's debut album, Good Nature.

Jack Bevan, Lina Simon and Yannis Philippakis were originally in cult math rock band the Edmund Fitzgerald. The group disbanded, claiming that things had become "too serious" and that they wanted to have more "fun making their music".

Walter Gervers and Jimmy Smith were part of a small Oxford band called Face Meets Grill. They met at and formed the band from members of Abingdon School, the same school that Radiohead attended. They played gigs in and around Oxford, and recorded an EP in Hull. After playing Truck Festival in 2004 they separated to follow different paths and careers.

Smith is the only band member to have completed his degree, which he took at Hull University. Each of the other band members quit their respective universities when the band signed to Transgressive Records.

=== 2007–2008: Antidotes ===
In early 2007, the band released the limited edition 7" singles "Hummer" and "Mathletics", both produced by Gareth Parton. "Hummer" later featured on the Channel Four teen drama Skins. Philippakis described this period as 'the music was almost a premeditated mix of blending techno and minimalism [and] we'd set ourselves these rules, like 'only staccato rhythms', and 'guitars must be played really high'.

In the summer of 2007, Foals began working on their debut album in New York. It was produced by Dave Sitek of TV on the Radio. The band decided to mix the album themselves, stating that Sitek made the first master copy of the album sound like "it was recorded in the Grand Canyon". Philippakis has stated a number of times that Foals and Sitek are on good terms, even though the mix by Sitek was rejected by the band. Foals released their debut album, titled Antidotes, on 24 March 2008 in the UK and on 8 April 2008 in the US. The album was a commercial success in the UK, debuting at number three on the UK Albums Chart. The album was a minor success in other countries, charting in Japan, France and the Netherlands. Non-UK versions of the album include the early Parton-produced singles.

=== 2009–2011: Total Life Forever ===
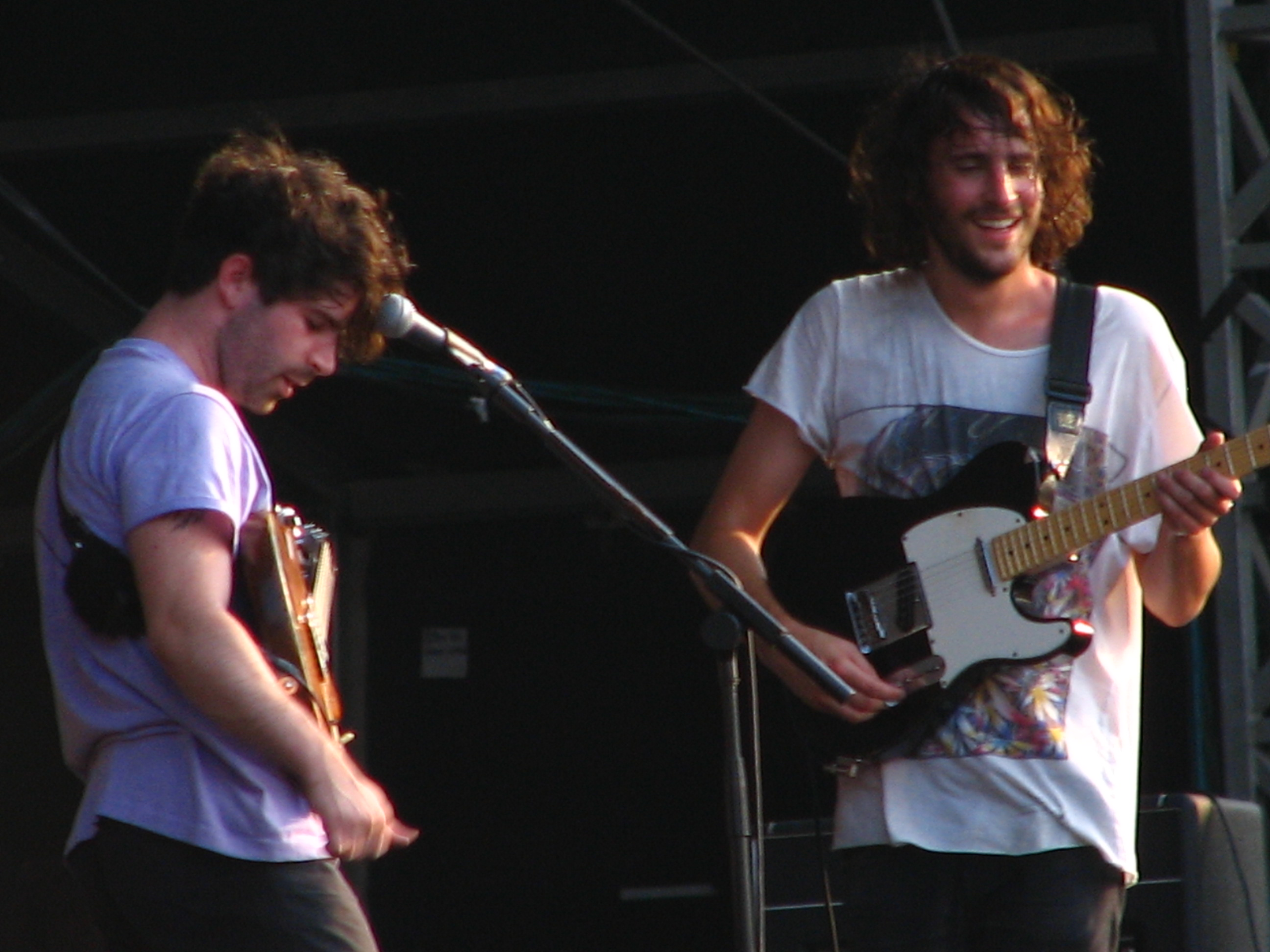
Foals supporting Blur at their comeback show in Hyde Park, London, on 2 July 2009

In August 2009, Foals started recording their second album at Svenska Grammofon Studion in Gothenburg, Sweden. The album, Total Life Forever, was described by the band members as sounding "like the dream of an eagle dying". The band have described the album as being "a lot less funk" than they had originally planned. The album was produced by Luke Smith, formerly of Clor. The album's title is named after an element of Ray Kurzweil's theory of singularity. Philippakis has professed a longtime interest in futurology, with it informing numerous songs on Total Life Forever.

On 1 March 2010, the promotional single "Spanish Sahara" was first played on Zane Lowe's show Radio 1. Foals' website was updated that night with the video for the track, directed by longtime collaborator Dave Ma, and on 6 March, the Total Life Forever site was launched. There puzzles revealed images, lyrics and sound clips of songs from the album. The last clip appeared on 12 March, with a password entry for Foals' new website. The site was opened on 13 March and presented the art concept and media including samples of songs, photos and videos. Lead single "This Orient" was released on 3 May 2010. The album was finally released on 10 May 2010.

"Spanish Sahara" was featured in trailers for season seven of Entourage, season four of Skins and Outcasts. It was also used in the soundtrack of the second season of the E4 drama Misfits. It was released as a full physical single in September 2010, featuring an edited remix starring the strings of London Contemporary Orchestra. In 2015, it was used by French studio Dontnod Entertainment in the game Life is Strange as the music for one of its endings.

The album was nominated for the 2010 Mercury Prize. In an interview with online magazine Coup de Main, Smith spoke about how the band members live together on and off the road – heading to Australia to record demos for their next album together. "It's just like touring with your family, it's nice."

=== 2012–2013: Holy Fire ===
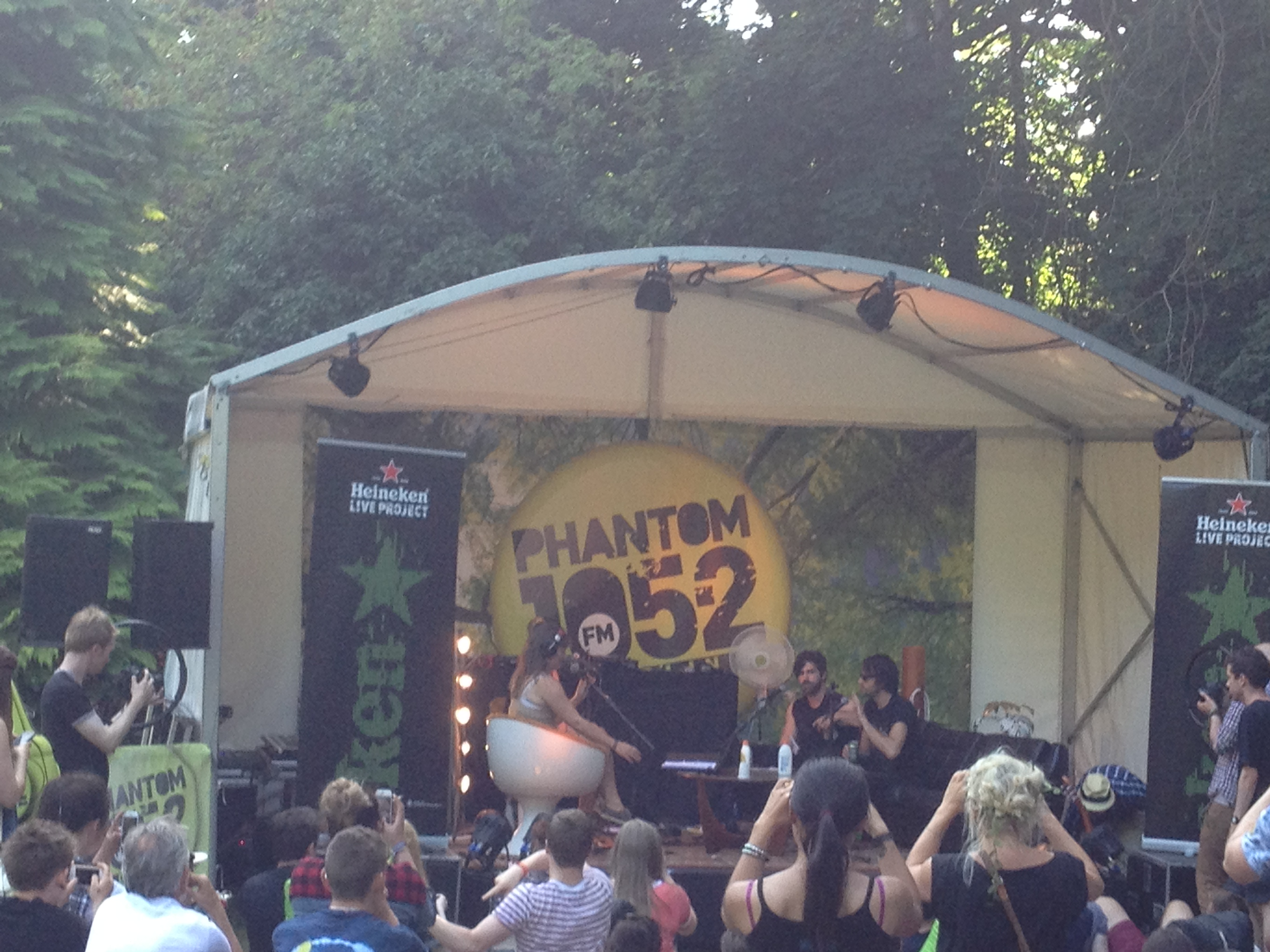
Foals being interviewed live on air by Phantom 105.2 at 2013 Longitude Festival in Dublin.

Holy Fire was released in both the UK and the US on 11 February 2013. The album's lead single, "Inhaler", received its first radio play on 5 November 2012. They played the song "My Number" for the first time on Later... with Jools Holland.

Holy Fire was produced by Flood and Alan Moulder, who have worked with many artists, including Nine Inch Nails, the Smashing Pumpkins, and My Bloody Valentine. The album was recorded at Assault & Battery Studios in London.

Philippakis stated that the recording process had some unconventional moments: "At one point we even made these poor studio interns collect bones. We were inspired by voodoo, these Haitian rhythms. We collected some ourselves, from butchers in Willesden High Road. Mainly cows, I think often they had gristle and cartilage on them, mainly cow and occasionally sheep. We had to order these big pots because one of the shoulder blades was too big! We boiled the flesh away so we could use them as percussion! We wanted to get primitive!"

According to The Guardian: "Their producers, Flood and Alan Moulder, even tricked them by recording their rehearsal in order to capture a more uninhibited sound."

In late November to mid-December, Foals toured the UK for an album preview. The tour was supported by Petite Noir (a close friend of Philippakis's). In summer 2013, they attended a number of festivals and headlined Latitude Festival in Suffolk in July. The band have recently played a World and UK tour, which ended with two sell out shows at Alexandra Palace in February. The two shows were in stark contrast compared to playing the same venue 7 years earlier to an almost empty room while supporting Bloc Party, a sentiment which lead singer Philippakis did not fail to mention during the live shows. Holy Fire was nominated for the Mercury Prize in 2013. Q awarded Foals with the Best Live Act award the same year while "Inhaler" received the Best Track award from NME. In a reader-nominated "Best Album of 2013" poll, Holy Fire topped the list; as did single "My Number" in a "Best Song of 2013" poll, beating NME favourites Arctic Monkeys, amongst other acclaimed bands.

=== 2014–2016: What Went Down ===
On 2 April 2014, in an interview with NME, Philippakis said: "Over the next month I think we're going to start writing tentatively. We've already got some bits and bobs around some riffs and some vocal melodies. I think until May we're gonna go back to Oxford and write in the 'stinkbox' and see what happens." On 9 June 2015, Foals unveiled a short video teasing an upcoming album in 2015.

Foals shared album track "Mountain at My Gates" on 20 June, premiering the song via BBC Radio 1 as Annie Mac's 'Hottest Record'. On 29 July, the band followed up the track with an accompanying 3D video, filmed on a GoPro HERO. On 6 August, Zane Lowe premiered new song 'A Knife in the Ocean' on his Beats 1 radio show on Apple Music. Foals made public a lyric video for 'A Knife In The Ocean' the same day. The album What Went Down was released on 28 August 2015.

In late 2015, "Mountain at My Gates" was featured on the official soundtrack of EA Sports FIFA 16.

In 2016, Foals toured the UK and Europe in February/March, followed by a US tour, playing a number of songs from What Went Down as well as previous releases, with support from Peace (DJ set) and Everything Everything (UK).

=== 2017–2019: Gervers's departure and Everything Not Saved Will Be Lost ===
In autumn 2017, Foals announced on social media that they were going to start recording material for a new upcoming album.

On 5 January 2018, they announced that bassist Walter Gervers was departing the band amicably, whilst recording of the fifth album continued.

On 8 January 2019, the band teased their fifth and sixth studio albums, Everything Not Saved Will Be Lost – Part 1 and Part 2, respectively. Part 1 was released on 8 March 2019 and Part 2 was released on 18 October 2019.

Following Gervers's departure, it was revealed on 19 February 2019 that Jeremy Pritchard, of British band Everything Everything, would join as touring bassist for the band's remaining live shows of 2019.

Everything Not Saved Will Be Lost – Part 1 was preceded by the release via streaming services of Exits, On the Luna, Sunday and In Degrees (a day before the record's release). The album was the BBC 6 Music Album of the Day on its release date.

In March 2019, the band embarked on the first shows of their Everything Not Saved Will Be Lost World Tour, which had dates running throughout 2019 and 2020.

After playing several festivals across the summer of 2019 (including an unannounced set at Glastonbury Festival and a headline performance at Truck Festival), the band released a second set of singles, "Black Bull", "The Runner" and "Into the Surf" in the lead up to Everything Not Saved Will Be Lost – Part 2.

Everything Not Saved Will Be Lost – Part 2 was released on 18 October 2019 through Warner and Transgressive Records. The album cover was shot by famed National Geographic photographer, Maggie Steber. The album became the band's first to reach No. 1 on the UK Albums Chart.

On 7 October 2019, "Rip Up The Road", a documentary detailing the recording sessions of "Everything Not Saved Will Be Lost" and subsequent 2019 world tour, was announced, with a premiere scheduled for 11 and 15 November 2019 at London's Doc’n Roll Film Festival and thereafter exclusively through Amazon Prime respectively.

On 11 November 2019 "Rip Up The Road" directed by Toby L premiered at the Rio Cinema in Dalston to an audience consisting of the band, friends and family, fans, documentary contributors/crew. The documentary was filmed over a 12-month period as the band embarked upon a world tour. The film hones in on two career highlight shows at London's Alexandra Palace and provides a candid, entertaining and gripping perspective of life on the road and being in a band. It also features their infamous Glastonbury Festival secret set on The Park Stage in 2019.

=== 2020–present: COVID-19, Congreave's departure, Life Is Yours and Gervers' return ===
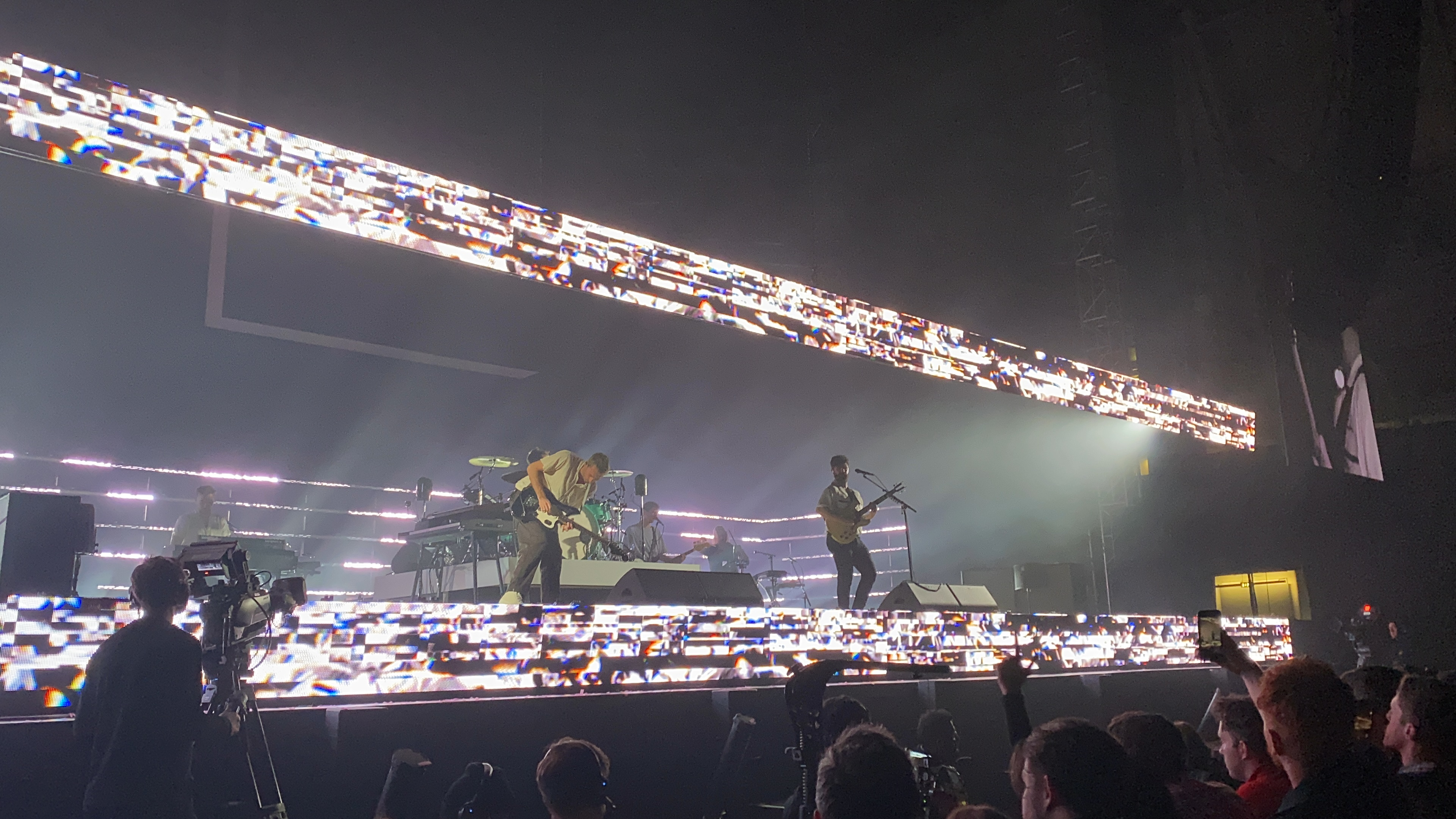
Foals performing "Black Bull" at Olympia London during their Life Is Yours Tour, April 2022.

Due to the COVID-19 crisis and subsequent global lockdowns, the band was forced to cancel and reschedule their entire 2020 UK and world tour, in support of Everything Not Saved Will Be Lost – Part 2 till Spring 2021. However, due to the continuing pandemic and ongoing safety restrictions throughout into 2021, the band once again had to reschedule touring until 2022, save for a string of UK summer festival shows during August 2021, which would be the group's first live performances since early 2020. In April 2022, 10 days before the tour commenced, it was re-branded to the Life Is Yours Tour in support of their upcoming seventh studio album.

On 22 September 2021, Edwin Congreave announced that he had left the band to pursue a postgraduate degree in economics. Announcing the news of Congreave's departure, the band revealed that they had already begun working on their next album, this time as a three piece band.

On 11 October 2021, the band announced scoring the opening theme of the BBC Two science documentary television series Universe, hosted by Brian Cox, with an updated version of "Neptune", re-worked in collaboration with Hans Zimmer's Bleeding Fingers composing collective led by the film composer.

On 27 October 2021, the band teased a promotional clip of an iPhone snooze alarm, cryptically revealing the release date of their seventh studio album's first single, "Wake Me Up" to be released 4 November 2021. The following day, the single was confirmed by the group with a teaser clip of the audio and music streaming platforms pre-save links respectively. "Wake Me Up" was premiered and released on 4 November 2021 via BBC Radio 1's Clara Amfo's 'Hottest Record'.

On 10 February 2022, Foals released "2am" and announced the name of their seventh album as Life Is Yours, and later announced the 17 June album release date.

On 1 April 2022, the band released the third single, "Looking High".

On 19 May 2022, Foals released the single "2001". Philippakis spoke to NME about the single, saying "'2001' feels like a postcard from the past. We moved to Brighton around that time, we were a young band, and there was the feeling of the first taste of independence. The moment you get those freedoms, you’re surrounded by temptation".

Three days before Life Is Yours was released, the band released the fifth and final single from the album, "Crest of the Wave".

Life Is Yours was released on 17 June 2022 through Warner, Transgressive and ADA. It received mostly positive reviews and debuted at number three in the UK.

On 2 May 2023, the band announced that founding bassist Walter Gervers had rejoined the group. The band then undertook a North American tour in support of Paramore, where they were joined by openers the Linda Lindas. The band's connection with Paramore continued later that year when they were enlisted to partake in Re: This is Why, a remixed version of their album This Is Why. Foals remixed the album's title track as part of the project.

== Live ==
Foals have won the 2013 Q Award for Best Live Act and were twice nominated for the NME Award for Best Live Act (2011 and 2013).

The band have released several live EPs (Live At Liars Club, iTunes Live: London Festival '08 and iTunes Festival: London 2010), in addition to the full-length concert film Live At The Royal Albert Hall, which was directed by Dave Ma.

Philippakis is known for jumping off balconies and crowd surfing during the extended interlude of "Two Steps, Twice". In October 2013, he got into a confrontation with a security guard at the Auckland Town Hall in New Zealand, as the security guard attempted to prevent him from jumping into the crowd. At the end of the show, Philippakis told the crowd: "I want to say a massive thank you to you and fuck that security guy."

== Musical style and influences ==
Foals are classified as an indie rock, alternative rock, dance-punk, math rock, art rock, post-rock, post-punk, art punk, and indie pop band.

The band's musical influences are varied, with the band members citing minimal techno, Arthur Russell, Krautrock bands such as Harmonia, and Talking Heads as their main sources of inspiration.

== Band members ==
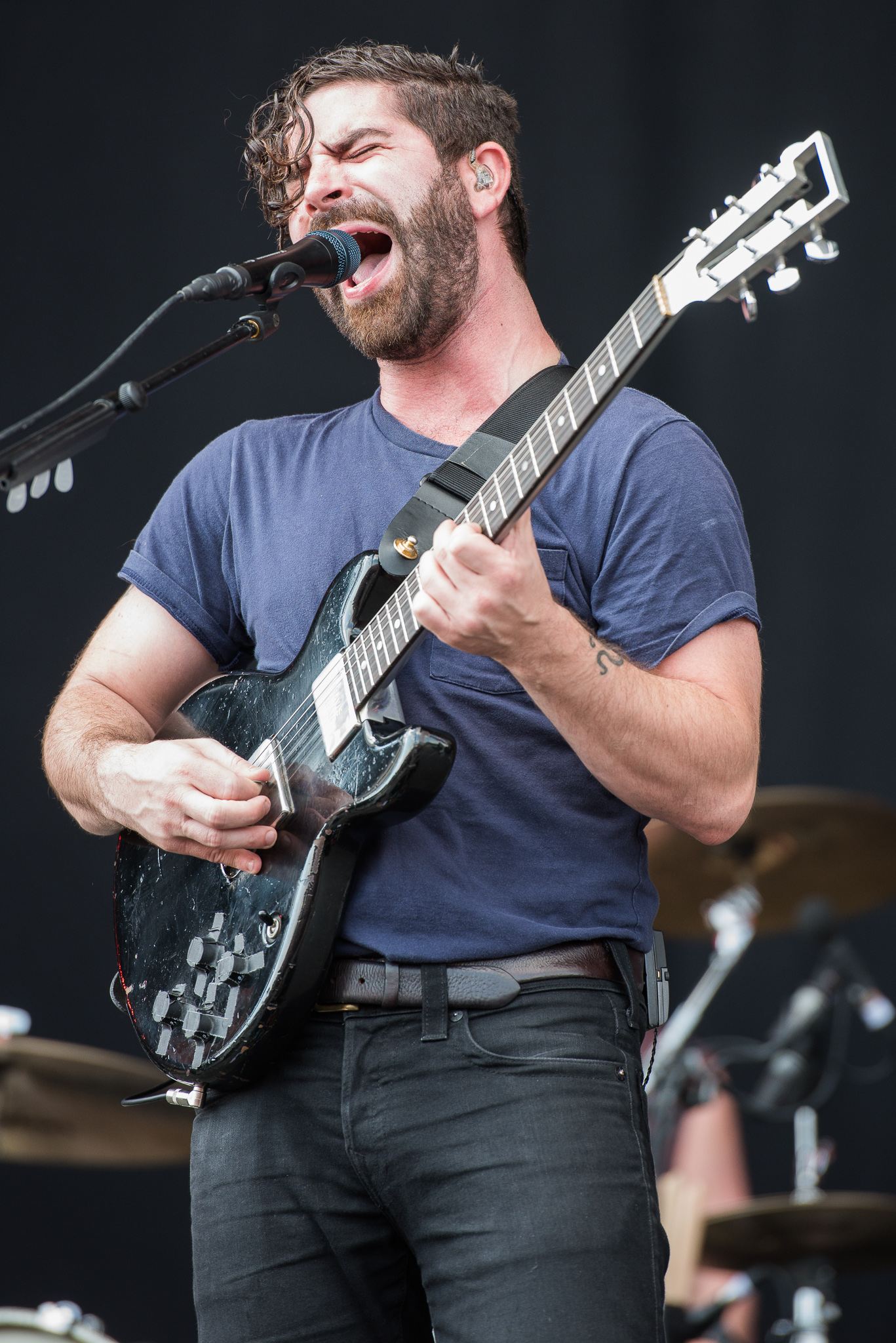
Yannis Philippakis

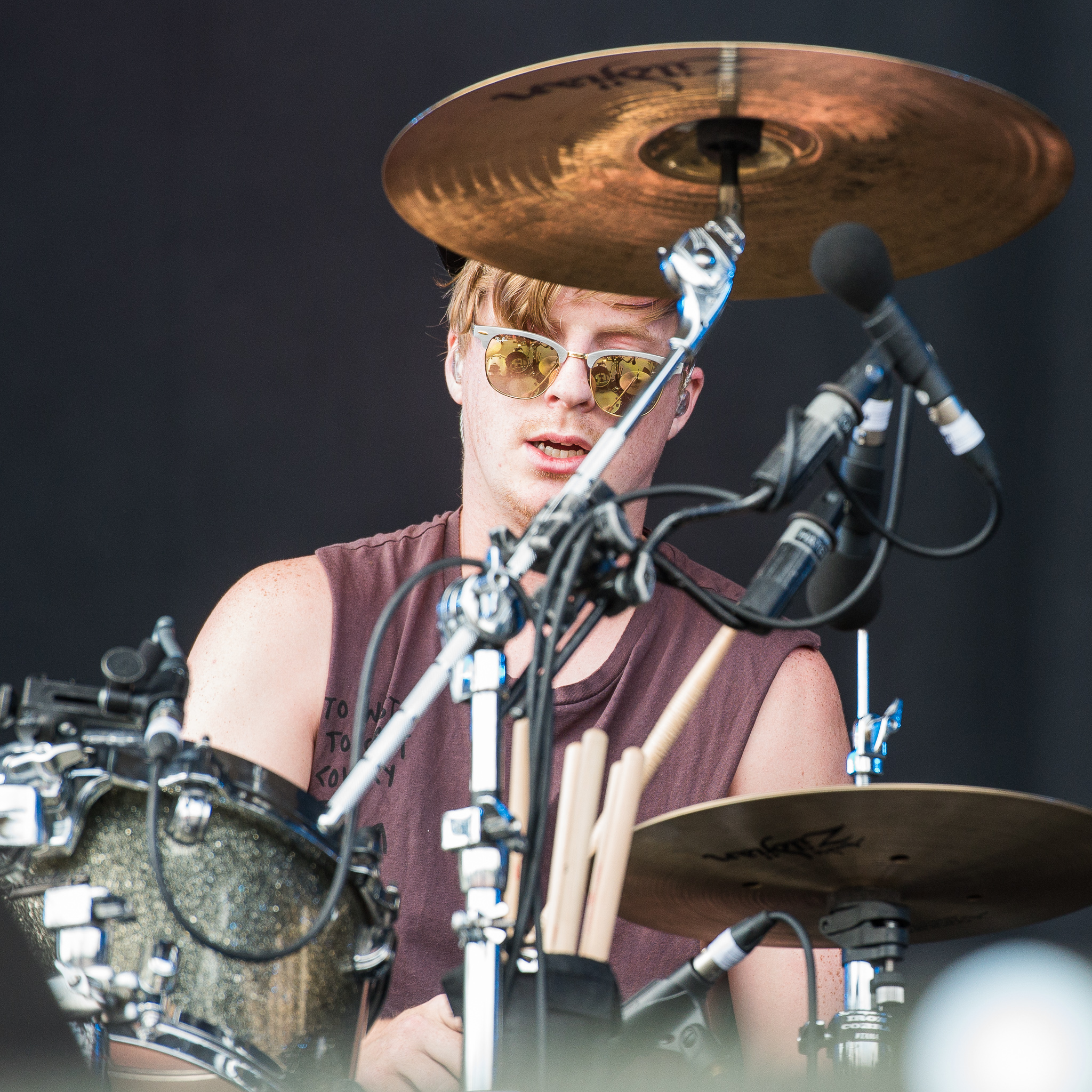
Jack Bevan

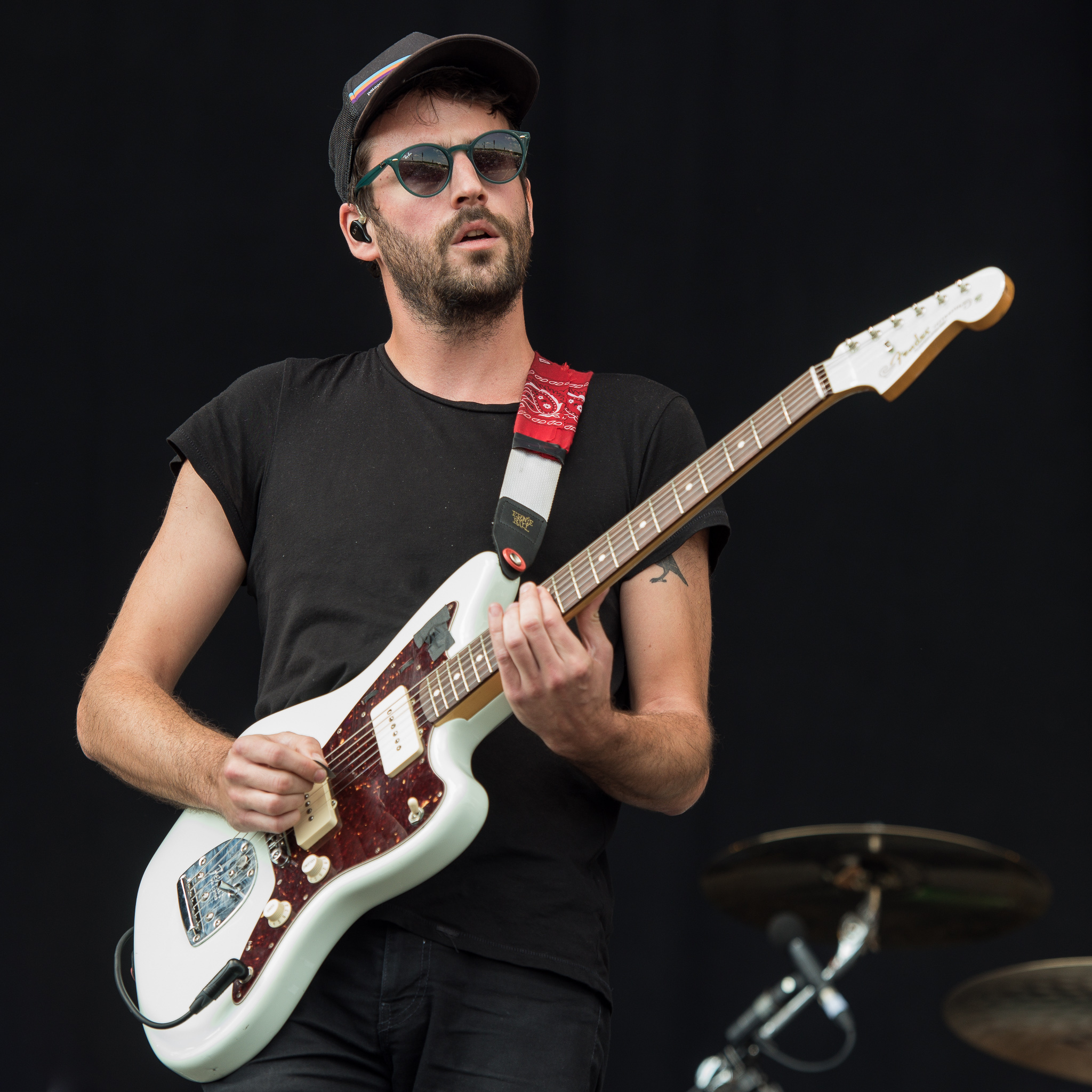
Jimmy Smith

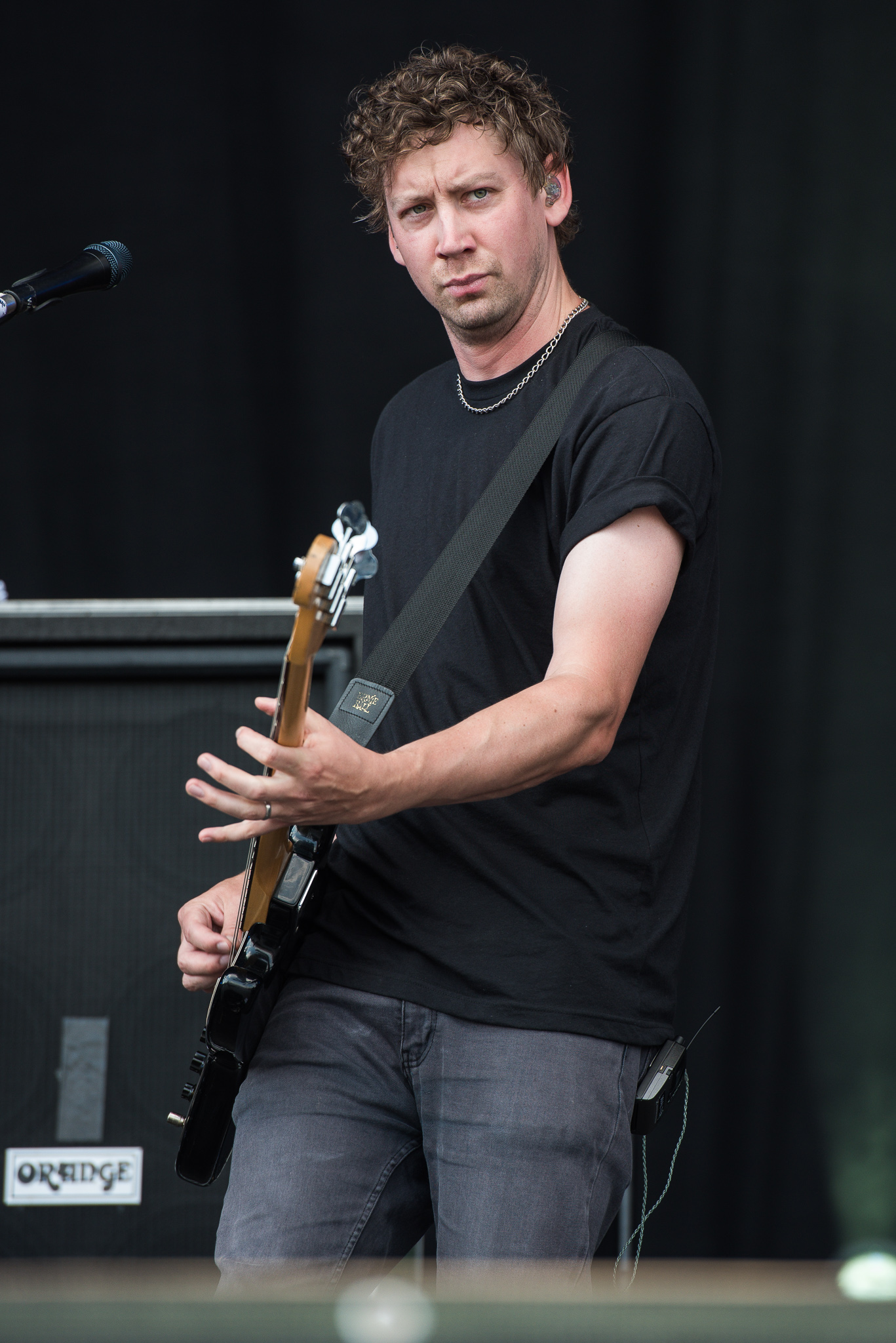
Walter Gervers

Current

- Yannis Philippakis – guitar (2005–present), lead vocals (2006–present), drums (2008–2013), bass (2018–2023), keyboards (2018), backing vocals (2005–2006)
- Jack Bevan – drums, percussion (2005–present)
- Jimmy Smith – guitar, keyboards, synthesizer, backing vocals (2005–present)
- Walter Gervers – bass, backing vocals (2005–2018, 2023–present), percussion (2008–2013)

Touring

- Kit Monteith – percussion, sampler, backing vocals (2016–present)
- Vincent Taeger – percussion, timbales (2019)
- Joe Price – keyboards, synthesizer (2022–present)
- Jeremy Pritchard – bass, synthesizer, backing vocals (2019, 2022)
- Jack Freeman – bass, synthesizer, backing vocals (2020–2022, 2022–2023)

Former

- Edwin Congreave – keyboards, synthesizer, backing vocals (2005–2021), bass (2018–2021)
- Andrew Mears – lead vocals, guitar (2005–2006)

Timeline

== Discography ==
Studio albums

- Antidotes (2008)
- Total Life Forever (2010)
- Holy Fire (2013)
- What Went Down (2015)
- Everything Not Saved Will Be Lost – Part 1 (2019)
- Everything Not Saved Will Be Lost – Part 2 (2019)
- Life Is Yours (2022)

== Recognition ==
Total Life Forever was nominated for the Mercury Prize in July 2010, losing to The xx's xx on 7 September that year. The album was tested again the following year for Best Album in addition to a nomination for Best Cover Artwork at the NME Awards. The single "Spanish Sahara" was nominated by the same group for Best Track on top of being named all-around Best Band and Best Live Act. In July, the MOJO honour awards also nominated Foals alongside Canadian band Arcade Fire for the calibre of their live performances.

=== Mercury Prize ===
Year	Nominee / work	Award	Result
2010	Total Life Forever	Best Album	Nominated
2013	Holy Fire	Best Album	Nominated
2019	Everything Not Saved Will Be Lost – Part 1	Best Album	Nominated

=== Ivor Novello Awards ===
Year	Nominee / work	Award	Result
2010	"Spanish Sahara"	Best Song Musically and Lyrically	Nominated

=== NME Awards ===
Year	Nominee / work	Award	Result
2011	Foals	Best British Band	Nominated
2011	Foals	Best Live Act	Nominated
2011	Total Life Forever	Best British Album	Nominated
2011	Total Life Forever	Best Artwork	Nominated
2011	"Spanish Sahara"	Best Track	Won
2013	Foals	Best Live Band	Nominated
2013	"Inhaler"	Best Track	Won
2014	Foals	Best British Band	Nominated
2016	What Went Down	Best Album	Won
2016	Foals	Best British Band	Nominated
2016	"What Went Down"	Best Track	Nominated
2020	Everything Not Saved Will Be Lost - Part 1	Best Album	Nominated
2020	Everything Not Saved Will Be Lost - Part 1	Best Album in the World	Nominated
2020	Foals	Best Live Act	Won
2022	"Wake Me Up"	Best Music Video	Won

=== Q Awards ===
Year	Nominee / work	Award	Result
2013	Holy Fire	Best Album	Nominated
2013	Foals	Best Act in the World Today	Nominated
2013	Foals	Best Live Act	Won
2015	Foals	Best Act in the World Today	Won
2015	"What Went Down"	Best Track	Nominated
2015	"What Went Down"	Best Video	Nominated
2019	Everything Not Saved Will Be Lost – Part 1	Best Album	Won

=== Berlin Music Video Awards ===
Year	Nominee / work	Award	Result
2020	LIKE LIGHTNING	BEST ANIMATION	Nominated

=== Brit Awards ===
Year	Nominee / work	Award	Result
2008	Foals	Critics' Choice Award	Nominated
2016	Foals	British Group	Nominated
2020	Foals	Best Group	Won

=== iHeartRadio Music Awards ===
Year	Nominee / work	Award	Result
2017	Foals	Best New Rock/Alternative Rock Artist	Nominated
