= Birds of Tokyo discography =

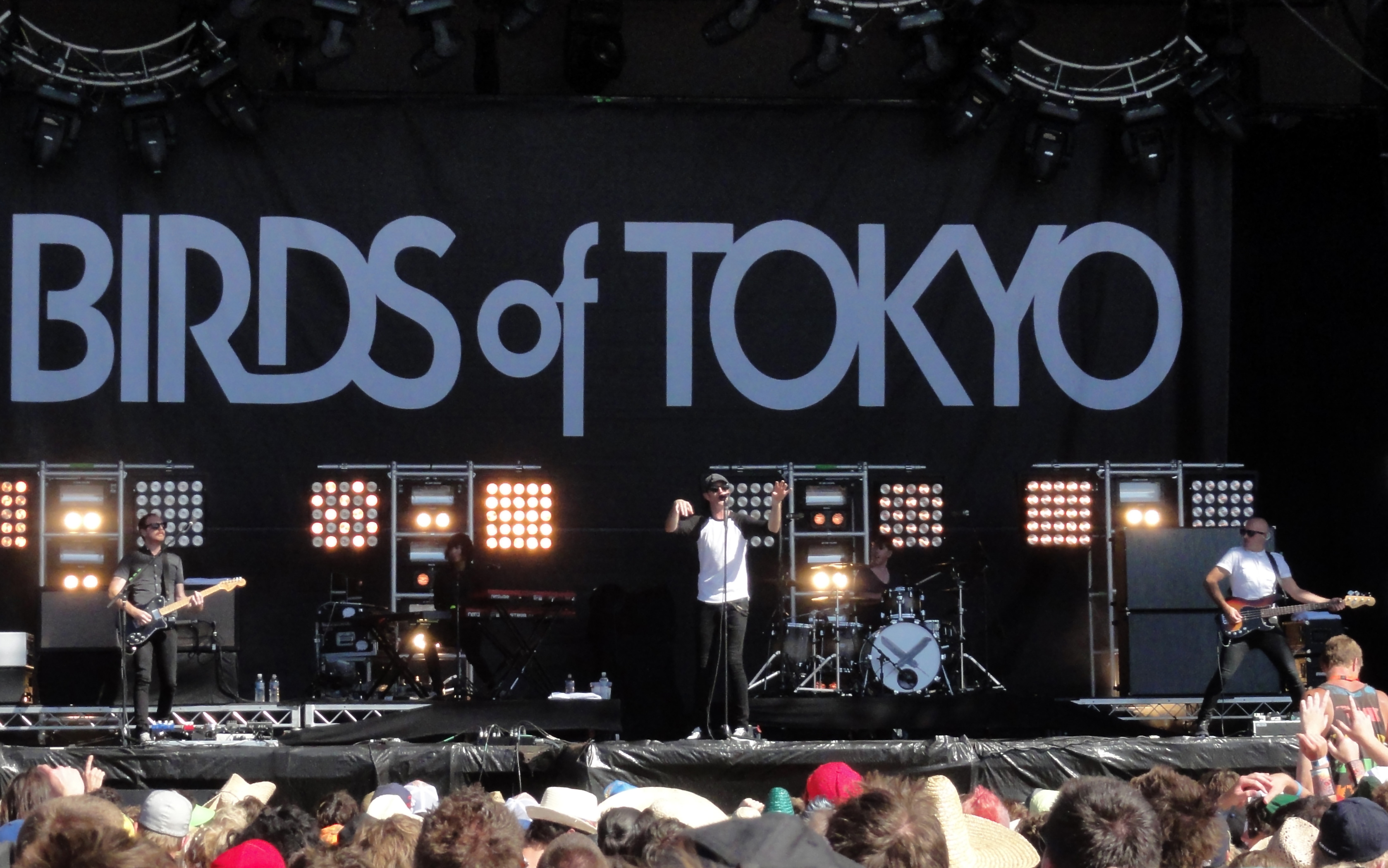
- Birds of Tokyo performing in January 2011
- Studio albums: 6
- EPs: 3
- Live albums: 1
- Compilation albums: 1
- Singles: 33
- Video albums: 1

The discography of Australian alternative rock band Birds of Tokyo consists of six studio albums, one compilation album, one live album, three EPs and thirty three singles.

== Albums ==
=== Studio albums ===
List of studio albums, with selected chart positions and certifications shown
Title	Album details	Peak chart positions	Certifications
Title	Album details	AUS	Certifications
Day One	Released: 2 February 2007; Label: Egg Records/MGM Distribution; Formats: CD, digital download	88	
Universes	Released: 8 July 2008; Label: Independent/MGM Distribution; Format: CD, digital download	3	ARIA: Gold
Birds of Tokyo	Released: 23 July 2010; Label: EMI; Format: CD, LP, digital download	2	ARIA: 2× Platinum
March Fires	Released: 1 March 2013; Label: EMI; Format: CD, digital download	1	ARIA: Platinum
Brace	Released: 4 November 2016; Label: EMI; Format: CD, digital download	3	
Human Design	Released: 24 April 2020; Label: Eleven, EMI; Format: CD, LP, digital download, streaming	1	

=== Live albums ===
List of live albums, with release date and selected chart positions shown
Title	Album details	Peak chart positions
Title	Album details	AUS
The Broken Strings Tour	Released: 5 February 2010; Label: Independent/MGM; Format: CD, digital download	11

=== Compilation albums ===
List of compilation albums, with release date and selected chart positions shown
Title	Album details	Peak chart positions
Title	Album details	AUS
Playlist	Released: 6 November 2015; Label: Birds of Tokyo, EMI Music Australia; Format: CD, digital download	4

== Extended plays ==
List of extended plays, with release date and selected chart positions shown
Title	Album details	Peak chart positions	Certifications
Title	Album details	AUS	Certifications
Birds of Tokyo	Released: January 2005; Label: Egg Records (Independent); Format: CD, digital download	—	
This Fire	Released: October 2012; Label: EMI; Format: CD, 10" vinyl, digital download	32	ARIA: Gold
Anchor	Released: 24 April 2015; Label: EMI; Format: Digital download, streaming	23	ARIA: 2× Platinum

== Singles ==
List of singles, with year and selected chart positions shown
Title	Year	Peak chart positions		Year-end positions		Certifications	Album
Title	Year	AUS	NZ	Triple J Hottest 100	ARIA Singles Chart	Certifications	Album
"One Way" / "Stay"	2005	—	—	—	—		Non-album single
"Off Kilter"	2006	—	—	—	—		Day One
"Black Sheets"	2007	—	—	—	—		Day One
"Wayside"	2007	—	—	61	—		Day One
"Silhouettic"	2008	—	—	22	—		Universes
"Broken Bones"	2008	—	—	20	—	ARIA: Gold	Universes
"Wild Eyed Boy"	2008	—	—	51	—		Universes
"White Witch"	2008	—	—	155	—		Universes
"Head in My Hands"	2009	—	—	—	—		Universes
"The Saddest Thing I Know"	2010	64	—	87	—		Birds of Tokyo
"Plans"	2010	11	32	4	47	ARIA: 8× Platinum; RMNZ: Platinum	Birds of Tokyo
"Wild at Heart"	2010	50	—	47	—	ARIA: Gold	Birds of Tokyo
"Circles"	2011	—	—	162	—		Birds of Tokyo
"This Fire"	2012	— (Note: Sales of "This Fire" counted towards the EP This Fire.)	—	51	—	ARIA: Platinum	This Fire (EP) and March Fires
"Lanterns"	2013	3	—	22	25	ARIA: 8× Platinum; RMNZ: Gold	March Fires
"When the Night Falls Quiet"	2013	43	—	—	—		March Fires
"Talking to a Stranger"	2013	—	—	—	—		Non-album single
"Anchor"	2015	— (Note: Sales of "Anchor" counted towards the EP Anchor.)	—	72	—		Anchor EP
"I'd Go with You Anywhere"	2015	18	—	146	—	ARIA: 2× Platinum	Playlist
"Brace"	2016	—	—	100	—		Brace
"Empire"	2016	—	—	—	—		Brace
"Unbreakable"	2018	— (Note: "Unbreakable" did not enter the ARIA Top 100 Singles Chart, but peaked at number 33 on the ARIA Digital Tracks Chart.)	—	—	—	ARIA: Gold	Human Design
"Good Lord"	2019	19	—	—	74	ARIA: 4× Platinum	Human Design
"The Greatest Mistakes"	2019	— (Note: "The Greatest Mistakes" did not enter the ARIA Top 100 Singles Chart, but peaked at number 21 on the ARIA Digital Tracks Chart.)	—	—	—	ARIA: Gold	Human Design
"Two of Us"	2020	65	—	—	—	ARIA: Platinum	Human Design
"Dive"	2020	—	—	—	—		Human Design
"Never Going Back"	2020	—	—	—	—		Human Design
"Weekend"	2020	—	—	—	—		Non-album single
"Superglue" (with Stand Atlantic)	2021	—	—	—	—		TBA
"Smith Street"	2022	—	—	—	—		TBA
"Daylight"	2022	—	—	—	—		TBA
"Lion"	2023	—	—	—	—		TBA
"Heartbreakers Bar"	2024	—	—	—	—		TBA

== DVDs ==
List of DVDs
Title	Details	Peak chart positions
Title	Details	AUS
The Broken Strings Tour	Released: 5 February 2010; Label: MGM; Format: DVD	3
