= Playlist (Birds of Tokyo album) =

Greatest hits album by Birds of Tokyo
- Released: 6 November 2015
- Recorded: 2005–2015
- Genres: Alternative rock; indie rock
- Length: 65:03
- Labels: Birds of Tokyo; EMI Music

Birds of Tokyo chronology
Anchor (EP) (2015)	Playlist (2015)	Brace (2016)

Singles from Playlist
- 1. "I'd Go with You Anywhere" Released: 25 September 2015

Playlist is the first greatest hits album from Australian alternative/rock group, Birds of Tokyo. The album includes tracks from the band's four studio albums and three extended plays. The album was released on 6 November 2015 and it debuted and peaked at number 4 on the Australian ARIA Charts.

== Background and release ==
The album was announced on 9 October 2015, alongside the release of the video for "I'd Go with You Anywhere". The band describe Playlist as "a nod to our creative journey so far, as much as it is looking to the next phase."

Guitarist Adam Spark explains that the idea for Playlist began in 2014 when the band was based in the United States. "It was a bit weird, after making music for ages we were suddenly doing interviews for the 'new faces' sections of magazines again. We needed to give American music industry people a quick sense of what the band was all about so we created a playlist that had a couple of key tracks off each album." Bass player Ian Berney adds: "Obviously 'Greatest Hits' albums are pretty much a thing of the past because now we can all just create our own playlists if we want. Most people don't even want to sit through one whole album these days let alone wading through five of them so at least this playlist puts all our most immediate songs in the one place and then if people hear it want to dig deeper, they can. There's plenty more where this came from."

== Critical reception ==
Professional ratings
Review scores
Source	Rating
The Music	2.5/5 stars
Renowned for Sound	4/5 stars

Michael Smith from Renowned for Sound gave the album 4 out of 5, writing: "The reverse chronological order of the album works well, easing new fans that may not have heard Birds of Tokyo's earlier material into something a little different to what they're used to from the band, and showing just much how they've matured over the years. There's been quite a drastic change since their humble beginnings: Opening on the poppy string sections of "I’d Go with You Anywhere" and the new age synth balladry of "Anchor", it marks a distinct change from the alt rock of "The Saddest Thing I Know" and "Broken Bones", let alone their aggressive post-grunge days, as represented by tracks like "Off Kilter" and "Wayside" at the tail end of the album."

Mark Beresford of The Music gave the album two-and-a-half out of five stars, remarking: "It's an interesting retrospect to see the slightly more unhinged rock origins of the band evolving into the radio heavies we hear today."

== Track listing ==
1. "I'd Go with You Anywhere" – 3:19
2. "Anchor" – 3:36
3. "Lanterns" – 4:22
4. "This Fire" – 4:47
5. "When the Night Falls Quiet" – 4:02
6. "Plans" – 3:37
7. "Circles" – 4:21
8. "Wild at Heart" – 4:02
9. "The Saddest Thing I Know" – 3:09
10. "Broken Bones" – 3:47
11. "Silhouettic" – 3:24
12. "Wild Eyed Boy" – 3:00
13. "Medicine" (Broken Strings version) – 3:28
14. "Wayside" – 4:30
15. "Black Sheets" – 3:13
16. "Off Kilter" – 2:33
17. "Stay" – 2:37
18. "Puzzle" – 3:16

== Charts ==
Chart performance for Playlist
Chart (2015)	Peak position
Australian Albums (ARIA)	4

== Release history ==
Release history for Playlist
Country	Date	Format	Label	Catalogue
Australia	6 November 2015	CD, digital download	Birds of Tokyo, EMI Music Australia	4759470
