= Triple J's Hottest 100 of 2010 =

Australian song chart in 2010

2010 Triple J Hottest 100
- Album artwork for the CD compilation

Countdown details
- Date of countdown: 26 January 2011

Countdown highlights
- Winning song: Angus & Julia Stone "Big Jet Plane"
- Most entries: Birds of Tokyo; Mark Ronson & The Business Intl. Pendulum; Washington; Bliss n Eso; Gorillaz; Arcade Fire; Gypsy & The Cat (3 tracks)

Chronology
← Previous; 2009	Next → 2011 (Australian Albums)

The 2010 Triple J Hottest 100 was announced and played on January 26, 2011. It is the eighteenth countdown of the most popular songs of the year, as chosen by the listeners of Australian radio station Triple J.

Voting commenced at midnight on Monday 20 December 2010, and closed at midnight on Sunday 16 January 2011. 1.26 million votes were recorded from 152 countries, a new record number of votes.

== Full list ==
Note: Australian artists

#	Song	Artist	Country of origin
1	Big Jet Plane	Angus & Julia Stone	Australia
2	Rock It	Little Red	Australia
3	Dance the Way I Feel	Ou Est le Swimming Pool	United Kingdom
4	Plans	Birds of Tokyo	Australia
5	Fall at Your Feet	Boy & Bear	Australia
6	Teenage Crime	Adrian Lux	Sweden
7	Fuck You!	CeeLo Green	United States
8	Tokyo (Vampires & Wolves)	The Wombats	United Kingdom
9	Magic Fountain	Art vs. Science	Australia
10	Somebody to Love Me	Mark Ronson & the Business Intl. featuring Boy George and Andrew Wyatt	United Kingdom/United States
11	ABC News Theme (Pendulum Remix)	Peter Wall and Tony Ansell	Australia
12	Rapunzel	Drapht	Australia
13	Clap Your Hands	Sia	Australia
14	Runaway	Kanye West featuring Pusha T	United States
15	Barbra Streisand	Duck Sauce	Canada/United States
16	Mace Spray	The Jezabels	Australia
17	Bang Bang Bang	Mark Ronson & the Business Intl. featuring Q-Tip and MNDR	United Kingdom/United States
18	There's Nothing In The Water We Can't Fight	Cloud Control	Australia
19	Crave You	Flight Facilities featuring Giselle	Australia
20	Sunday Best	Washington	Australia
21	Undercover Martyn	Two Door Cinema Club	United Kingdom
22	Jellylegs	Children Collide	Australia
23	Addicted	Bliss n Eso	Australia
24	Talking Like I'm Falling Down Stairs	Sparkadia	Australia
25	Eyes Wide Open	Gotye	Australia
26	Not in Love	Crystal Castles featuring Robert Smith	Canada/United Kingdom
27	You Got the Dirtee Love	Florence & the Machine and Dizzee Rascal	United Kingdom
28	Radar Detector	Darwin Deez	United States
29	It Can Wait	Illy featuring Owl Eyes	Australia
30	O.N.E.	Yeasayer	United States
31	Bloodbuzz Ohio	The National	United States
32	Pumped Up Kicks	Foster the People	United States
33	Solitude Is Bliss	Tame Impala	Australia
34	Punching in a Dream	The Naked & Famous	New Zealand
35	The Bike Song	Mark Ronson & The Business Intl. featuring Kyle Falconer and Spank Rock	United Kingdom/United States
36	Opposite of Adults	Chiddy Bang	United States
37	Doncamatic	Gorillaz featuring Daley	United Kingdom
38	Young Blood	The Naked & Famous	New Zealand
39	Revolution	John Butler Trio	Australia
40	Baby, I'm Gettin' Better	Gyroscope	Australia
41	Down by the River	Bliss n Eso	Australia
42	On Melancholy Hill	Gorillaz	United Kingdom
43	We No Speak Americano	Yolanda Be Cool and DCUP	Australia
44	Baptism	Crystal Castles	Canada
45	Rabbit Song	Boy & Bear	Australia
46	Way Back Home	Bag Raiders	Australia
47	Wild at Heart	Birds of Tokyo	Australia
48	Witchcraft	Pendulum	Australia
49	Easy to Love	The Jezabels	Australia
50	One Life Stand	Hot Chip	United Kingdom
51	Ambling Alp	Yeasayer	United States
52	Overpass	The John Steel Singers	Australia
53	Reflections	Bliss n Eso	Australia
54	Holidays	Miami Horror featuring Alan Palomo	Australia/United States
55	Giving Up the Gun	Vampire Weekend	United States
56	Bring Night	Sia	Australia
57	Kickstarts	Example	United Kingdom
58	The Suburbs	Arcade Fire	Canada
59	Rich Kids	Washington	Australia
60	My Eagle	Children Collide	Australia
61	Jackson's Last Stand	Ou Est le Swimming Pool	United Kingdom
62	Hold On	Angus & Julia Stone	Australia
63	Ready to Start	Arcade Fire	Canada
64	Jona Vark	Gypsy & The Cat	Australia
65	One Step	Dead Letter Circus	Australia
66	Audience	Cold War Kids	United States
67	Holiday	Vampire Weekend	United States
68	Dog	Andy Bull featuring Lisa Mitchell	Australia
69	Watercolour	Pendulum	Australia
70	Paper Romance	Groove Armada featuring Fenech-Soler and Saint Saviour	United Kingdom
71	The Piper's Song	Gypsy & The Cat	Australia
72	I Can Talk	Two Door Cinema Club	United Kingdom
73	Time to Wander	Gypsy & The Cat	Australia
74	Lucidity	Tame Impala	Australia
75	Coming Around	Hungry Kids of Hungary	Australia
76	Radioactive	Kings of Leon	United States
77	Shutterbugg	Big Boi featuring Cutty	United States
78	Stylo	Gorillaz featuring Bobby Womack and Mos Def	United Kingdom/United States
79	Slow Motion	Little Red	Australia
80	Howlin' for You	The Black Keys	United States
81	Echoes	Klaxons	United Kingdom
82	Tighten Up	The Black Keys	United States
83	Modern Man	Arcade Fire	Canada
84	The Hardest Part	Washington	Australia
85	I Feel Better	Hot Chip	United Kingdom
86	Queensland	Evil Eddie	Australia
87	The Saddest Thing I Know	Birds of Tokyo	Australia
88	Monster	Kanye West featuring Jay-Z, Rick Ross, Bon Iver and Nicki Minaj	United States/Trinidad and Tobago
89	Barricade	Interpol	United States
90	Finally See Our Way	Art vs. Science	Australia
91	Northcote (So Hungover)	The Bedroom Philosopher	Australia
92	I Can Change	LCD Soundsystem	United States
93	Anyone's Ghost	The National	United States
94	Time to Smile	Xavier Rudd and Izintaba	Australia/South Africa
95	The High Road	Broken Bells	United States
96	Go Do	Jónsi	Iceland
97	Sleepwalker	Parkway Drive	Australia
98	Spanish Sahara	Foals	United Kingdom
99	Big	Dead Letter Circus	Australia
100	Neutron Star Collision (Love Is Forever)	Muse	United Kingdom

=== #101–#200 List ===
On 10 February 2011, Richard Kingsmill revealed the #101–#200 list on his blog.

#	Song	Artist	Country of origin
101	XXXO	M.I.A.	United Kingdom
102	Rill Rill	Sleigh Bells	United States
103	Miami	Foals	United Kingdom
104	Odessa	Caribou	Canada
105	Power	Kanye West	United States
106	Save Our Town	Philadelphia Grand Jury	Australia
107	All Summer	Kid Cudi, Best Coast and Rostam Batmanglij	United States
108	I <3 U So	Cassius	France
109	Mowgli's Road	Marina & The Diamonds	United Kingdom
110	Colours	Grouplove	United States
111	Pyro	Kings of Leon	United States
112	Swoon	The Chemical Brothers	United Kingdom
113	Avalanche	British India	Australia
114	Katy on a Mission	Katy B	United Kingdom
115	From Above	Ben Folds and Nick Hornby	United States/United Kingdom
116	Tenderoni	Kele	United Kingdom
117	I Believe You Liar	Washington	Australia
118	Home	LCD Soundsystem	United States
119	Palaces of Montezuma	Grinderman	Australia
120	Through the Clover	Stonefield	Australia
121	Everything You Wanted	Kele	United Kingdom
122	Laredo	Band of Horses	United States
123	I Wish I Knew Natalie Portman	k-os featuring Saukrates and Nelly Furtado	Canada
124	Close to You	John Butler Trio	Australia
125	Settle Down	Kimbra	New Zealand
126	40 Day Dream	Edward Sharpe & the Magnetic Zeros	United States
127	Superfast Jellyfish	Gorillaz featuring De La Soul and Gruff Rhys	United Kingdom/United States
128	Boyfriend	Best Coast	United States
129	Anchors	The Amity Affliction	Australia
130	iFly	Ball Park Music	Australia
131	Hey Ya! (Like a Version)	Sarah Blasko	Australia
132	Drunk Girls	LCD Soundsystem	United States
133	The Show Goes On	Lupe Fiasco	United States
134	Your Love	The Aston Shuffle	Australia
135	Work	Bluejuice	Australia
136	Na Na Na (Na Na Na Na Na Na Na Na Na)	My Chemical Romance	United States
137	Falling	The Cat Empire	Australia
138	All of the Lights	Kanye West featuring Rihanna and Kid Cudi	United States/Barbados
139	For You	Angus & Julia Stone	Australia
140	Meditation Song #2 (Why, Oh Why)	Cloud Control	Australia
141	What Do I Know About Pain?	Gyroscope	Australia
142	Dancing on My Own	Robyn	Sweden
143	Stop Trying	Sia	Australia
144	Snake Charmer	Bag Raiders	Australia
145	When You Walk in the Room	Fyfe Dangerfield	United Kingdom
146	Some of the Places I Know	Gyroscope	Australia
147	Symphonies	Dan Black featuring Kid Cudi	United Kingdom/United States
148	Parade of the Dead	Hilltop Hoods	Australia
149	Dance Yrself Clean	LCD Soundsystem	United States
150	Come Back Home	Two Door Cinema Club	United Kingdom
151	All These Things	Darren Hanlon	Australia
152	I Look to You	Miami Horror featuring Kimbra	Australia/New Zealand
153	Beneath The Satellite	British India	Australia
154	Death By Diamonds And Pearls	Band of Skulls	United Kingdom
155	American Slang	The Gaslight Anthem	United States
156	Shampain	Marina & The Diamonds	United Kingdom
157	Hold on My Heart (The Presets Remix)	Sarah Blasko	Australia
158	Derezzed	Daft Punk	France
159	Just Got Started	360 featuring Pez	Australia
160	Forever and Ever Amen	The Drums	United States
161	Alter Ego	Tame Impala	Australia
162	Circles	Birds of Tokyo	Australia
163	Get Some	Lykke Li	Sweden
164	King of the Beach	Wavves	United States
165	Down For the Count	Girl Talk	United States
166	Airplanes	Local Natives	United States
167	Falling Away	Big Scary	Australia
168	Celestica	Crystal Castles	Canada
169	Take Me Over	Cut Copy	Australia
170	Madder Red	Yeasayer	United States
171	Peek-A-Boo	Bertie Blackman	Australia
172	Saddest Summer	The Drums	United States
173	Tightrope	Janelle Monáe featuring Big Boi	United States
174	Family Affair	Bliss n Eso	Australia
175	Four Seasons in One Day	Paul Kelly and Angus Stone	Australia
176	Louder Than Ever	Cold War Kids	United States
177	Dark Fantasy	Kanye West	United States
178	No Surprises	Regina Spektor	United States
179	The Chase	Illy featuring Oliver Daysoul	Australia/United States
180	Bright Lights Bigger City	CeeLo Green	United States
181	This Orient	Foals	United Kingdom
182	Moon Theory	Miami Horror	Australia
183	This Too Shall Pass	OK Go	United States
184	Harmony To My Heartbeat	Sally Seltmann	Australia
185	Feeling's Gone	The Cat Empire	Australia
186	Lost in the World	Kanye West featuring Bon Iver	United States
187	Black Crow	Angus & Julia Stone	Australia
188	Crossfire	Brandon Flowers	United States
189	Wristwatch	Hungry Kids of Hungary	Australia
190	It's All My Fault	Nicholas Roy	Australia
191	Animal Rights	Deadmau5 and Wolfgang Gartner	Canada/United States
192	Devil's Spoke	Laura Marling	United Kingdom
193	Youngbloods	The Amity Affliction	Australia
194	Sprawl II (Mountains Beyond Mountains)	Arcade Fire	Canada
195	Dirtee Disco	Dizzee Rascal	United Kingdom
196	Modern Day Addiction	Clare Bowditch & The New Slang	Australia
197	Memories	Weezer	United States
198	Mitsubitchi	The Subs	Belgium
199	Broken Bones	The Holidays	Australia
200	Doubt	Delphic	United Kingdom

== Statistics ==
=== Artists with multiple entries ===
#	Artist	Entries
3	Birds of Tokyo	4, 47, 87
3	Mark Ronson & The Business Intl.	10, 17, 35
3	Pendulum (Note: Twice as a lead artist (48, 69), one remix (11))	11, 48, 69
3	Washington	20, 59, 84
3	Bliss n Eso	23, 41, 53
3	Gorillaz	37, 42, 78
3	Arcade Fire	58, 63, 83
3	Gypsy & The Cat	64, 71, 73
2	Angus & Julia Stone	1, 62
2	Little Red	2, 79
2	Ou Est le Swimming Pool	3, 61
2	Boy & Bear	5, 45
2	Art vs. Science	9, 90
2	Sia	13, 56
2	Kanye West	14, 88
2	The Jezabels	16, 49
2	Two Door Cinema Club	21, 72
2	Children Collide	22, 60
2	Crystal Castles	26, 44
2	Yeasayer	30, 51
2	The National	31, 93
2	Tame Impala	33, 74
2	The Naked and Famous	34, 38
2	Hot Chip	50, 85
2	Vampire Weekend	55, 67
2	Dead Letter Circus	65, 99
2	The Black Keys	80, 82

=== Countries represented ===
Country	#
Australia	51
United States	26
United Kingdom	21
Canada	6
New Zealand	2
Iceland	1
South Africa	1
Sweden	1
Trinidad and Tobago	1

=== Records ===
- Angus & Julia Stone are the first Australian band to win the Hottest 100 since Augie March in 2006. This is also the first countdown since 1994 which features female vocalist in the winning song. Julia Stone is also the first woman to win the Hottest 100 time since Janet English in 1996.
- For a second year in a row a Triple J Unearthed artist has cracked the Top 10 (Art vs. Science No. 2 in 2009, Little Red No. 2, Boy & Bear No. 5 and Art vs Science No. 9 in 2010).
- John Butler Trio scored the No. 39 position for the second year in a row.
- Both members of Gnarls Barkley got a respective track in the list with different bands; Danger Mouse with Broken Bells and Cee-Lo Green with a solo track.
- Ian Kenny has now appeared in the Hottest 100 every year since 2005 with both Karnivool and Birds of Tokyo.
- For the first time since 2005 no artist from France appeared in the Hottest 100.
- Chiddy Bangs "Opposite of Adults" samples the song "Kids" by MGMT which came fifth in the 2008 countdown.
- "Runaway" by Kanye West becomes the equal longest song to appear in a countdown, alongside "Jesus of Suburbia" by Green Day which came in at No. 61 in 2005.
- Robert Smith's collaboration on the Crystal Castles cover of "Not in Love" set the record for the longest absence between countdowns (13 years); Smith last appeared in the 1997 countdown with The Cure.
- Nicki Minaj is the first artist from Trinidad and Tobago to appear in the Hottest 100.
- Following Charles Haddon's death in August 2010, Ou Est Le Swimming Pool's two appearances marks the first posthumous appearance of an artist since Jeff Buckley in the 2004 countdown.
- As of the 2025 Hottest 100, the 2010 countdown is the last Hottest 100 not to feature at least one Like a Version.

== Top 20 Albums of 2010 ==
Triple J Listeners voted for their favourite album of 2010 in a similar format to the Hottest 100. Voters were allowed to vote for any album released in 2010 and were limited to ten votes.

Bold indicates the winner of the Hottest 100, while Tame Impala's Innerspeaker won the J Award for Australian Album of the Year.

#	Artist	Album	Country of origin	Tracks in the Hottest 100
1	Arcade Fire	The Suburbs	Canada	58, 63, 83
2	Tame Impala	Innerspeaker	Australia	33, 74
**3**	**Angus & Julia Stone**	**Down the Way**	**Australia**	**1, 62 (40 in 2009)**
4	Vampire Weekend	Contra	United States	55, 67 (22, 52 in 2009)
5	Cloud Control	Bliss Release	Australia	18
6	LCD Soundsystem	This Is Happening	United States	92
7	Washington	I Believe You Liar	Australia	20, 59, 84 (67 in 2009)
8	The National	High Violet	United States	31, 93
9	Two Door Cinema Club	Tourist History	United Kingdom	21, 72
10	Yeasayer	Odd Blood	United States	30, 51
11	Kanye West	My Beautiful Dark Twisted Fantasy	United States	14, 88
12	Birds of Tokyo	Birds of Tokyo	Australia	4, 47, 87
13	Mark Ronson & The Business Intl.	Record Collection	United Kingdom	10, 17, 35
14	Gorillaz	Plastic Beach	United Kingdom	42, 78
15	Sia	We Are Born	Australia	13, 56 (72 in 2009)
16	Foals	Total Life Forever	United Kingdom	98
17	The Black Keys	Brothers	United States	80, 82
18	Little Red	Midnight Remember	Australia	2, 79
19	Children Collide	Theory of Everything	Australia	22, 60
20	Hungry Kids of Hungary	Escapades	Australia	75

== CD Release ==
CD 1
1. Angus & Julia Stone – "Big Jet Plane" (#1)
2. Little Red – "Rock It" (#2)
3. Ou Est Le Swimming Pool – "Dance the Way I Feel" (#3)
4. Cee-Lo Green – "Fuck You!" (#7)
5. Sia – "Clap Your Hands" (#13)
6. The Wombats – "Tokyo (Vampires and Wolves)" (#8)
7. Birds of Tokyo – "Plans" (#4)
8. Boy & Bear – "Fall at Your Feet" (#5)
9. Mark Ronson & the Business Intl. feat. Boy George & Andrew Wyyat – "Somebody To Love Me" (#10)
10. Foster the People – "Pumped Up Kicks" (#32)
11. Washington – "Sunday Best" (#20)
12. Two Door Cinema Club – "Undercover Martyn" (#21)
13. Cloud Control – "There's Nothing in the Water We Can't Fight" (#18)
14. Kanye West feat. Pusha T – "Runaway" (#14)
15. Gypsy & the Cat – "Jona Vark" (#64)
16. The National – "Bloodbuzz Ohio" (#31)
17. Children Collide – "Jellylegs" (#22)
18. Bliss n Eso – "Addicted" (#23)
19. Duck Sauce – "Barbra Streisand" (#15)
20. Pendulum – "Witchcraft" (#48)
21. Florence and the Machine & Dizzee Rascal – "You've Got the Dirtee Love" (Live) (#27)
CD 2
1. Yeasayer – "O.N.E." (#30)
2. Adrian Lux – "Teenage Crime" (#6)
3. Tame Impala – "Solitude is Bliss" (#33)
4. Sparkadia – "Talking Like I'm Falling Down Stairs" (#24)
5. Crystal Castles feat. Robert Smith – "Not in Love" (#26)
6. Art vs. Science – "Magic Fountain" (#9)
7. Darwin Deez – "Radar Detector" (#28)
8. Arcade Fire – "The Suburbs" (#58)
9. Flight Facilities feat. Giselle – "Crave You" (#19)
10. Drapht – "Rapunzel" (#12)
11. The Naked and Famous – "Punching in a Dream" (#34)
12. Gorillaz feat. Daley – "Doncamatic" (#37)
13. Illy feat. Owl Eyes – "It Can't Wait" (#29)
14. The Jezabels – "Mace Spray" (#16)
15. Bag Raiders – "Way Back Home" (#46)
16. Gotye – "Eyes Wide Open" (#25)
17. Gyroscope – "Baby, I'm Gettin' Better" (#40)
18. Hot Chip – "One Life Stand" (#50)
19. Miami Horror feat. Alan Palomo – "Holidays" (#54)
20. The John Steel Singers – "Overpass" (#52)
21. Angus & Julia Stone – "Big Jet Plane" (Live)

=== DVD release ===
1. Angus & Julia Stone – "Big Jet Plane"
2. Little Red – "Rock It"
3. Ou Est Le Swimming Pool – "Dance the Way I Feel"
4. Birds of Tokyo – "Plans"
5. Adrian Lux – "Teenage Crime"
6. Cee-Lo Green – "Fuck You"
7. The Wombats – "Tokyo (Vampires & Wolves)"
8. Art vs. Science – "Magic Fountain"
9. Mark Ronson & the Business Intl. feat. Boy George & Andrew Wyatt – "Somebody to Love Me"
10. Drapht – "Rapunzel"
11. Sia – "Clap Your Hands"
12. Duck Sauce – "Barbra Streisand"
13. The Jezabels – "Mace Spray"
14. Cloud Control – "There's Nothing in the Water We Can't Fight"
15. Flight Facilities feat. Giselle – "Crave You"
16. Washington – "Sunday Best"
17. Two Door Cinema Club – "Undercover Martyn"
18. Children Collide – "Jellylegs"
19. Bliss n Eso – "Addicted"
20. Sparkadia – "Talking Like I'm Falling Down Stairs"
21. Gotye – "Eyes Wide Open"
22. Darwin Deez – "Radar Detector"
23. Illy feat. Owl Eyes – "It Can't Wait"
24. Yeasayer – "O.N.E."
25. The National – "Bloodbuzz Ohio"
26. Tame Impala – "Solitude is Bliss"
27. The Naked and Famous – "Punching in a Dream"
28. Chiddy Bang – "Opposite of Adults"
29. Gorillaz feat. Daley – "Doncomatic"
30. John Butler Trio – "Revolution"
31. Gyroscope – "Baby, I'm Gettin' Better"
32. Yolanda Be Cool vs. DCUP – "We Speak No Americano"
33. Boy & Bear – "Rabbit Song"
34. Bag Raiders – "Way Back Home"
35. Hot Chip – "One Life Stand"
36. The John Steel Singers – "Overpass"
37. Miami Horror feat. Alan Palamo – "Holidays"
38. Vampire Weekend – "Giving Up the Gun"
39. Arcade Fire – "The Suburbs"
40. Hungry Kids of Hungary – "Coming Around"
41. Big Boi feat. Cutty – "Shutterbugg"
42. Klaxons – "Echoes"
43. Evil Eddie – "Queensland"
44. The Bedroom Philosopher – "Northcote (So Hungover)"
45. Angus & Julia Stone – "Big Jet Plane (Live)"
