= Off-kilter =

Off-kilter is an idiom meaning "askew". It may also refer to:

- Off Kilter (band), a Celtic rock band that played at Epcot during 1997–2014 and remained active afterwards
- "Off Kilter" (song), a 2005 song by Birds of Tokyo on their debut album Day One
