= I'd Go with You Anywhere =

Single by Birds of Tokyo

from the album Playlist
- Released: 25 September 2015
- Length: 3:19
- Label: EMI
- Songwriters: Ian Kenny, Adam Spark, Adam Weston, Glenn Sarangapany, Ian Berney

Birds of Tokyo singles chronology
"Anchor" (2015)	"I'd Go with You Anywhere" (2015)	"Brace" (2016)

Music video
- "I'd Go with You Anywhere" on YouTube

"I'd Go with You Anywhere" is the first single from Australian alternative rock band Birds of Tokyo's compilation album, Playlist. It was co-written by the group's members, Ian Berney, Ian Kenny, Glenn Sarangapany, Adam Spark, and Adam Weston, and was released on 25 September 2015. "I'd Go with You Anywhere" debuted at No. 40 on the ARIA singles chart and peaked at No. 18 five weeks later, becoming Birds of Tokyo's third Top 20 hit after "Plans" (2010) and "Lanterns" (2013).

Band member Ian Kenny said "the song is all about our own journey, where we’re going and where we can take things. It’s all about possibility, and I like the idea of the romance that we can go anywhere." At the APRA Music Awards of 2017 the song won Rock Work of the Year.

== Track listing ==
1. "I'd Go with You Anywhere" (Ian Berney, Ian Kenny, Glenn Sarangapany, Adam Spark, Adam Weston) - 3:19

== Music video ==
The song's accompanying music video was directed by Josh Logue and released on 8 October 2015 via YouTube. It features band member Kenny strolling across a range of urban and natural Australian landscapes before having dealings with a flock of birds.

== Charts ==
Chart (2015)	Peak position
Australia (ARIA)	18
Australian Artist Singles (ARIA)	2

== Certifications ==
Region	Certification	Certified units/sales
Australia (ARIA)	2× Platinum	140,000^{‡}
^{‡} Sales+streaming figures based on certification alone.
