= This Fire (EP) =

EP by Birds of Tokyo
- Released: 5 October 2012
- Recorded: 2012
- Genres: Alternative rock, indie rock
- Labels: Birds of Tokyo, EMI Music

Birds of Tokyo chronology
| Birds of Tokyo (2010) | This Fire (2012) | March Fires (2013) |

This Fire is the second extended play album by Australian alternative/rock group, Birds of Tokyo. It was released in October 2012 and peaked at number 32. It was certified gold.

The songs "This Fire" and "Boy" were included on the 2013 studio album, March Fires.

== Lyrics content ==
"This Fire" EP sees the band attacking different lyrical themes. While not overtly political or preachy there's a recurring motif of people coming together which reflects the increasingly interconnected world in which this music was created. In fact the title track is nothing less than a clarion call for togetherness. "At some level those lyrics probably reflect the way the band itself was coming together", reflects Ian Kenny. "We collaborated a lot more on this music for a lot longer than we've ever spent before. We consciously set out to stretch ourselves in every possible direction and hopefully that shows."

== Reception ==
An anonymous reviewer from Sputnik Music praised the EP saying; "The new EP truly is uncharted territory for the band. Its song structures are spacious and drawn out, with more synthesized sounds to create a brooding, almost bittersweet atmosphere. The songs all progress from softer, serene beginnings into emotional chants, the best example being the opening title track where the pace changes from quieter percussions and guitars into Kenny’s rebellious chorus of “This fire, this fire, this fire, we let it all burn" adding "This EP is a collection of four beautiful songs that show a band experimenting with their sound and being excited by the results".

== Track listing ==
This Fire EP
| No. | Title | Length |
|---|---|---|
| 1. | "This Fire" | 4:52 |
| 2. | "Glowing in the Streets" | 4:00 |
| 3. | "Boy" | 5:00 |
| 4. | "The Lake" | 5:10 |

== Charts ==
"This Fire (EP)" peaked at #32 on the Australian Singles Chart and reached #5 on the ARIA Australian Singles Chart.

=== Weekly charts ===
| Chart (2012) | Peak position |
|---|---|
| Australia (ARIA) | 32 |

== Certifications ==
| Region | Certification | Certified units/sales |
|---|---|---|
| Australia (ARIA) | Gold | 35,000^{^} |
^{^} Shipments figures based on certification alone.

== Release history ==
| Region | Date | Format | Label | Catalog no. |
|---|---|---|---|---|
| Australia | 5 October 2012 | Digital download. Compact Disc | EMI | 2326180 |
| United Kingdom | 5 October 2012 | Digital download. Compact Disc | EMI | 2326180 |
| United States | 5 October 2012 | Digital download. Compact Disc | EMI | 2326180 |
