= Human Design (album) =

Studio album by Birds of Tokyo
- Released: 24 April 2020
- Length: 38:20
- Label: Birds of Tokyo; Eleven: A Music Company; EMI Australia

Birds of Tokyo chronology
Brace (2016)	Human Design (2020)

Singles from Human Design
- 1. "Unbreakable" Released: 21 September 2018; 2. "Good Lord" Released: 26 February 2019; 3. "The Greatest Mistakes" Released: 16 August 2019; 4. "Two of Us" Released: 17 January 2020; 5. "Dive" Released: 20 April 2020; 6. "Never Going Back" Released: 26 June 2020

Human Design is the sixth studio album by Australian alternative rock band Birds of Tokyo. It was announced on 28 February 2020, and was released on 24 April 2020. Human Design debuted at number 1 on the ARIA Charts, becoming the band's second chart-topping album after March Fires in 2013.

The album marks a shift in direction for the band as the lyrics reflect and documents the breakdown of singer Ian Kenny's marriage. Kenny said: "These four singles we've released over the last 18 months have each been very personal and direct in different ways. It's great that they seem to have struck deep chords with lots of people, but in the first instance, I was just writing words to stop myself going nuts". Kenny later added: "It's filled with regret [...] I could have said things better, but the result is eloquent and emotional".

== Singles ==
"Unbreakable" was released on 21 September 2018 and was chosen as theme song for the 2018 Invictus Games. The song peaked at number 33 on the Australian Digital Tracks. "Good Lord" was released on 26 February 2019 as the album's second single. The song peaked at number 19 on the ARIA charts and was nominated for two ARIA Music Awards at the 2019 awards. "The Greatest Mistakes" was released on 16 August 2019 as the album's third single. It peaked at number 21 on the Australian Digital Tracks. "Two of Us" was released on 17 January 2020 and peaked at number 4 on the Australian Digital Tracks. "Dive" was announced on the group's Twitter account as the album's fifth single on 20 April 2020. On 26 June 2020, the single edit of "Never Going Back" was released.

== Reception ==
Jeff Jenkins from Stack magazine claimed the album "could be a campfire singalong" and said "Their songs might be grand designs – rousing and anthemic – but at their core, they are simple and direct, with the choir of voices in the choruses making them relatable for every listener."

Tyler Jenke said "Human Design sees emotional vulnerability at the forefront of Birds Of Tokyo's classic sound, exploring new ground and serving as a powerful, cathartic record" calling it "one of the strongest releases of their career to date." Georgie Gray called the album "A triumphant celebration to the resilience of human spirit." Brittany Jenke said it's "a record that is as powerful as it is hopeful, making it stand as one of the year's most important releases."

== Track listing ==
Human Design track listing
No.	Title	Length
1.	"The Greatest Mistakes"	2:34
2.	"Two of Us"	3:30
3.	"Good Lord"	3:25
4.	"Designed"	3:14
5.	"Dive"	3:47
6.	"When Home Calls"	3:12
7.	"Photo by the Lake"	3:29
8.	"Addison"	3:45
9.	"My Darling, My Son"	3:36
10.	"Unbreakable"	3:14
11.	"Never Going Back"	4:34
Total length:		38:20

== Charts ==
=== Weekly charts ===
Weekly chart performance for Human Design
Chart (2020)	Peak position
Australian Albums (ARIA)	1

=== Year-end charts ===
Year-end chart performance for Human Design
Chart (2020)	Position
Australian Artist Albums (ARIA)	34

== Release history ==
Release formats for Human Design
Country	Date	Format	Label
Australia	24 April 2020	Digital download, CD, LP, streaming	Birds of Tokyo/Eleven: A Music Company/EMI Music

== See also ==
- List of number-one albums of 2020 (Australia)
