= Two of Us (Birds of Tokyo song) =

Single by Birds of Tokyo

from the album Human Design
- Released: 17 January 2020
- Length: 3:27
- Label: Birds of Tokyo, EMI
- Songwriter(s): Adam Spark, Adam Weston, Glenn Sarangapany, Ian Berney, Ian Kenny
- Producer(s): Adam Spark, Scott Horscoft, Patrick Rahme

Birds of Tokyo singles chronology
"The Greatest Mistakes" (2019)	"Two of Us" (2020)	"Dive" (2020)

Music video
- "Two of Us" on YouTube

"Two of Us" is a song by Australian alternative rock band Birds of Tokyo. It was released on 17 January 2020 as the fourth single from the band's sixth studio album, Human Design. The song was premiered on the band's Good Lord Tour.

The song was nominated for Most Performed Alternative Work and shortlisted for Song of the Year at the APRA Music Awards of 2021

== Music video ==
The music video for "Two of Us" was released on 3 February 2020. Director Zac Lynch-Woodlock said "We all had a lot of fun making this clip. I've been friends with the guys for ages, and when Glenn and Berney approached me about collaborating on a music video, I was super keen. They had some nice references in mind including the idea of doing the video as a one-shot which always presents its own unique set of challenges, Finding an interesting location that would allow continuous movement along a road for the entire song being one of them." Lynch-Woodlock said "We wanted to show Kenny's journey as a road to redemption and the clip picks up from the bloodied and beaten Kenny in the 'Good Lord' music video. 'Two of Us' travels with a bandaged Kenny as he transitions with the help of some friends to a place of happiness."

== Charts ==
=== Weekly charts ===
Chart (2020)	Peak position
Australia (ARIA)	65

=== Year-end charts ===
Chart (2020)	Position
Australian Artist (ARIA)	37

== Certifications ==
Region	Certification	Certified units/sales
Australia (ARIA)	Platinum	70,000^{‡}
^{‡} Sales+streaming figures based on certification alone.
