= The Broken Strings Tour =

Live album by Birds of Tokyo
- Released: 5 February 2010
- Recorded: Enmore Theatre, Sydney 14 November 2009; Melbourne Town Hall, Melbourne, 15 November 2009
- Genre: Alternative rock, indie rock
- Length: 79:23
- Label: Birds of Tokyo, MGM Records
- Producer: Anthony Cormican

Birds of Tokyo chronology
| Universes (2008) | The Broken Strings Tour (2010) | Birds of Tokyo (2010) |

The Broken Strings Tour is the first live album by the Australian alternative rock band Birds of Tokyo. It was released as a double CD/DVD on 5 February 2010 and debuted and peaked at number 11 on the Australian ARIA Charts.

At the ARIA Music Awards of 2010, the DVD was nominated for Best Music DVD but lost to Sound Relief by various artists.

== Background and recording ==
In 2009, Birds of Tokyo came up with the idea to show Australian audiences a very different and unexpected side of the band. They stripped their music down and rebuilt it with acoustic sounds and orchestration.

The band took this sound on their Broken Strings tour, performing to venues across Australia, working with producer, composer, and longtime collaborator Anthony Cormican. The performances included a variety of instruments, from ukuleles to 12-string guitars, as well as a string quartet and a grand pianist. The album was recorded at the Enmore Theatre on 14 November 2009 and the Melbourne Town Hall on 15 November. It was announced on 4 January 2010.

== Reception ==
Professional ratings
Review scores
| Source | Rating |
|---|---|
| Music Feeds | 4/5 stars |

Jenny Meagher from Music Feeds gave the album 4 out of 5, saying: "I am certain had I been sitting there watching this show live at the Enmore Theatre, I would have shed a tear."

== Track listing ==
CD1

1. "Overture" – 2:58
2. "Armour for Liars" – 4:36
3. "Like Rain" – 4:35
4. "Russian Roulette" – 3:56
5. "Black Sheets" – 3:56
6. "Rose" – 3:35
7. "Wild Eyed Boy" – 3:03
8. "The Bakers Son" – 7:19

CD2

1. "I Heard it Through the Grapevine" – 4:27
2. "Head in My Hands" – 5:11
3. "Train Wrecks" – 4:58
4. "Violet" – 4:16
5. "Rest Here My Brother" – 4:19
6. "Off Kilter" – 3:48
7. "Wayside" – 4:56
8. "Broken Bones" – 5:05
9. "Medicine" – 4:25
10. "Silhouettic" – 4:10

DVD

The DVD features footage of all songs listed above (excluding "Heard it Through the Grapevine") as well as interviews with the band members and string composer/arranger Anthony Cormican.

== Charts ==
| Chart (2010) | Peak position |
|---|---|
| Australian Albums (ARIA) | 11 |
| Australian Artist Album (ARIA) | 2 |
| Australian Top 40 Music DVD (ARIA) | 3 |

== Release history ==
| Country | Date | Format | Label | Catalogue |
|---|---|---|---|---|
| Australia | 5 February 2010 | CD/DVD, digital download | Birds of Tokyo MGM Distribution | BOT005 |
