= Brace (album) =

Studio album by Birds of Tokyo
- Released: 4 November 2016
- Genres: Alternative rock; hard rock
- Length: 46:29
- Label: EMI
- Producer: David Bottrill

Birds of Tokyo chronology
Playlist (2015)	Brace (2016)	Human Design (2020)

Singles from Brace
- 1. "Brace" Released: 21 September 2016; 2. "Empire" Released: 31 October 2016

Brace is the fifth studio album by Western Australian alternative rock band Birds of Tokyo. It was announced on 21 September, alongside the release of the album lead single, "Brace". The album was released on 4 November 2016.

In an interview with Triple J in February 2016, the band said the album was written and "radio isn't going to play it", stating "this will be like nothing you've heard before from us". Upon announcement of the album in September 2016, the band described the album as taking a "darker, dirty rock direction", adding "Mums of Australia are going to hate it".

A six-date tour was announced in October 2016. Birds of Tokyo lead singer Ian Kenny said: "When we were writing and recording we kept talking about how we wanted to make a really dark and intense rock record that would be great to play live. So we can't wait to finally crank out these new songs as well as lots of others at some gigs."

== Singles ==
- "Brace" was the album's lead single.
- "Empire" was released on 31 October 2016 as the album's second single, alongside the music video which was directed by Sean Vandenberg. The band said "We felt it was the right time to start talking about heavier things in our work which are important to us as a matter of daily discourse and we really hope you find something in this."

== Reception ==
Professional ratings
Review scores
Source	Rating
Rolling Stone Australia	3.5/4 stars

Rod Yates from Rolling Stone Australia said: "Hats off to Birds of Tokyo – given the success they've had with radio-friendly fodder such as ""Lanterns", they could have been forgiven for riding that wave into a well-funded retirement. Instead, [they have] made an album as dark as the times in which it was written. "Harlequins" sees them embrace their inner Muse, a reference that rears its head perhaps a little too frequently ("Gods", "Brace"), while the brooding "Pilot" finds Ian Kenny asking, "If I had to drown myself in gasoline would you carry the match for me?". Clearly not an album for your next party, it is, however, one that requires – and rewards – full immersion."

Triple J said: "Teaming up with producer David Bottrill, the Perth born five-piece return to the darker, heavier sounds of the band's roots. With dystopian lyrics and crunchy guitars, Brace is an album created to be played live."

Emmy Mack from Music Feeds wrote: "Birds Of Tokyo have come home to roost with their heaviest album in close to a decade", adding "Experimenting with an evil laboratory of sounds to craft an album that simultaneously feels familiar and yet completely different to anything we’ve heard from this band – or any other for that matter — before."

== Track listing ==
No.	Title	Length
1.	"Harlequins"	4:39
2.	"Brace"	4:48
3.	"Empire"	3:27
4.	"Gods"	4:29
5.	"Discoloured" (featuring Hayley Mary)	4:17
6.	"Pilot"	5:33
7.	"Crown"	4:17
8.	"Above / Below"	4:03
9.	"Catastrophe"	4:16
10.	"Mercy Arms"	6:40

== Charts ==
Chart performance for Brace
Chart (2016)	Peak position
Australian Albums (ARIA)	3
New Zealand Heatseeker Albums (RMNZ)	5

== Release history ==
Release history for Brace
Country	Date	Format	Label
Australia	4 November 2016	Digital download, CD, LP	EMI / Universal Music Australia
