= Unbreakable (Birds of Tokyo song) =

Single by Birds of Tokyo

from the album Human Design
- Released: 21 September 2018
- Length: 3:12
- Label: Birds of Tokyo, EMI

Birds of Tokyo singles chronology
"Empire" (2016)	"Unbreakable" (2018)	"Good Lord" (2019)

Music video
- "Unbreakable" on YouTube

"Unbreakable" is a song by Australian alternative rock band Birds of Tokyo. The song is about resilience and was chosen as the theme of the 2018 Invictus Games in Sydney and performed the track at the official Closing Ceremony on 27 October at Sydney Super Dome. The song was released on 21 September 2018 and was the most added song to Australian radio for the week commencing 27 September 2018. "Unbreakable" will be featured on their upcoming sixth studio album, Human Design (2020).

Upon release band member Ian Kenny said "After a couple of years of fleeting highs and extreme lows, new music has now emerged squinting through the bright light of what seemed like a long and twisted tunnel. Only when we truly get kicked down do we learn what we're made of. Through the rebuild, reflection and remains we find out who and what we are. We live on. We love more. We let go."

== Music video ==
The official music video for "Unbreakable" was directed by Matt Sav and released on 11 October 2018. The clip follows the escapades of a young couple, portrayed by Sophia Natale and Birds Of Tokyo frontman Ian Kenny and was shot in Perth.

== Track listing ==
Digital download

1. "Unbreakable" – 3:12

== Charts ==
Chart (2018)	Peak position
Australian Digital Tracks (ARIA)	33

== Certifications ==
Region	Certification	Certified units/sales
Australia (ARIA)	Gold	35,000^{‡}
^{‡} Sales+streaming figures based on certification alone.
