= Day One (Birds of Tokyo album) =

Studio album by Birds of Tokyo
- Released: 3 February 2007
- Recorded: 2006
- Genres: Alternative rock, post-grunge
- Length: 40:32
- Label: Egg Records/MGM Distribution
- Producers: Adam Spark; Birds of Tokyo

Birds of Tokyo chronology
Birds of Tokyo (EP) (2005)	Day One (2007)	Universes (2008)

Singles from Day One
- 1. "Off Kilter" Released: 2006; 2. "Black Sheets" Released: 2007; 3. "Wayside" Released: 2007

Day One is the debut studio album from Birds of Tokyo, released on 3 February 2007 on independent label, Egg Records, through MGM Distribution. The album was recorded at Studio Couch, Fremantle, Sing Sing Studios, Melbourne, Big Rock Studio, Dunsborough, Loop Studios, West Perth and Underground Studios, Fremantle in late 2006. The album debuted and peaked at No. 88 on the ARIA Albums Chart.

The album garnered the band two Western Australian Music Industry Awards in 2007 and two again in 2008 (from a total of six nominations).

Three songs from the album received high rotation on Triple J, the album was also selected as iTunes album of the week and received two AIR Award nominations.

Three singles were released from the album, "Off Kilter" in 2006, "Black Sheets" and "Wayside" both in 2007.

== Track listing ==
No.	Title	Length
1.	"Black Sheets"	3:13
2.	"Off Kilter"	2:33
3.	"Minor War"	3:38
4.	"Violet"	4:03
5.	"Wayside"	4:29
6.	"Desperate"	3:07
7.	"Like Rain"	4:05
8.	"Get Out"	4:32
9.	"Eduardo"	3:07
10.	"Rest Here My Brother"	3:58
11.	"Are You Sure You're Alive?"	3:47

== Charts ==
Chart (2007)	Peak position
Australia (ARIA)	88
