= Daylight (Birds of Tokyo song) =

Single by Birds of Tokyo
- Released: 18 November 2022
- Length: 4:02
- Label: Birds of Tokyo, EMI
- Songwriter(s): Ian Kenny: Adam Spark; Adam Weston; Ian Berney; Glenn Sarangapany
- Producer(s): Adam Spark

Birds of Tokyo singles chronology
"Smith Street" (2022)	"Daylight" (2022)	"Lion" (2023)

Music video
- "Daylight" on YouTube

"Daylight" is a song by the Australian alternative rock band Birds of Tokyo, released on 18 November 2022.

At the APRA Music Awards of 2024, the song won Most Performed Alternative Work.

The music video, directed by Kane Hibberd, was also released on 18 November 2022.
