= Anchor (EP) =

EP by Birds of Tokyo
- Released: 24 April 2015
- Recorded: 2015, Los Angeles
- Genre: Alternative rock, indie rock
- Label: Birds of Tokyo, EMI Music

Birds of Tokyo chronology
March Fires (2013)	Anchor (2015)	Playlist (2015)

Anchor is the third extended play album by Australian alternative/rock group, Birds of Tokyo. It was released in April 2015 and peaked at number 23. It was certified platinum.

The EP was written and recorded in Los Angeles which became Birds of Tokyo's home base for most of 2014. "As we were writing through that time, there was so much going on for us there in L.A.," Ian Kenny explained. "There was lots of shows and we were constantly in and out of the studio with a lot of commitments so we felt like fairly restless creatures – and we were considering calling the EP Restless Creatures," he revealed.

The band toured Australia throughout May and June 2016.

== Reception ==
Professional ratings
Review scores
Source	Rating
Renowned for Sound	4/5 stars

Jamie Parmenter from Renowned for Sound gave the album 4 out of 5 saying: "Anchor is a brave and bold EP. The band has really focused their energies onto creating something with a different atmosphere to previous work, and it’s really paid off."

== Track listing ==
1. "Anchor" – 3:36
2. "Puzzle" – 3:16
3. "Weight of the World" – 3:25
4. "Touch the Screen" – 3:27

== Charts ==
=== Weekly charts ===
Chart (2015)	Peak position
Australian Albums (ARIA)	23

=== Year end charts ===
Chart (2015)	Position
Australian Artist Albums (ARIA)	13

== Certifications ==
Region	Certification	Certified units/sales
Australia (ARIA)	2× Platinum	140,000^{‡}
^{‡} Sales+streaming figures based on certification alone.

== Release history ==
Country	Date	Format	Label
Australia	24 April 2015	Digital download	Birds of Tokyo, EMI Music Australia
