= One Way/Stay =

"One Way" / "Stay"

Single by Birds of Tokyo
- A-side: "One Way" / "Stay"
- B-side: "Rose"
- Released: 10 October 2005
- Recorded: July 2005; Sing Sing Studios, Melbourne
- Genre: Alternative rock
- Length: 9:06
- Label: Egg/MGM
- Songwriters: Adam Spark, Ian Kenny, Anthony Jackson, Adam Weston
- Producer: Forrester Savell

Birds of Tokyo singles chronology
"One Way" / "Stay" (2005)	"Off Kilter" (2006)

Music video
- "Stay" on YouTube

"One Way" / "Stay" is a double A-sided debut single from Australian alternative rockers, Birds of Tokyo, released on 10 October 2005 on independent label, Egg Records, through MGM Distribution. The songs were recorded in July 2005 at Sing Sing Studios in Melbourne and they were produced by Forrester Savell (Helmet, Karnivool, Full Scale). All three tracks were written by the four band members: Adam Spark, Ian Kenny, Anthony Jackson and Adam Weston.

"Stay" earned the band their first WAM Song of the Year nomination, for 'Rock Song of the Year'. Australian Music Online described the group's sound, "music marries soaring vocal melodies with catchy rock based guitar hooks and a driving rhythm section, the live show is filled with an energy as raw and exposing as it is energetic, emotive and fun".

== Background ==
One Way" / "Stay" is a double A-sided single from Australian alternative rockers, Birds of Tokyo, released on 10 October 2005 on independent label, Egg Records, through MGM Distribution. The group had formed in 2004 as a side project for Perth-based bands, Karnivool (Ian Kenny on vocals, Adam Spark on guitar) and Tragic Delicate (Anthony Jackson on bass guitar, Adam Weston on drums).

The group issued their debut self-titled Extended play, "Birds of Tokyo (Demo)", in January 2005. The quartet travelled to Sing Sing Studios in Melbourne in July that year to record three more tracks. They were produced by Forrester Savell (Helmet, Karnivool, Full Scale). In early October the single was launched at the Amplifier Bar in Perth to an audience of nearly 500 people.

"Stay" earned the band their first WAM Song of the Year nomination, for 'Rock Song of the Year'. Australian Music Online described the group's sound, "music marries soaring vocal melodies with catchy rock based guitar hooks and a driving rhythm section, the live show is filled with an energy as raw and exposing as it is energetic, emotive and fun".

== Track listing ==
No.	Title	Writer(s)	Length
1.	"One Way"	Adam Spark, Ian Kenny, Anthony Jackson, Adam Weston	3:42
2.	"Stay"	Adam Spark, Ian Kenny, Anthony Jackson, Adam Weston	2:35
3.	"Rose" (Acoustic)	Adam Spark, Ian Kenny, Anthony Jackson, Adam Weston	3:10
