= March Fires =

Studio album by Birds of Tokyo
- Released: 1 March 2013
- Recorded: February – October 2012 (see recording)
- Genres: Alternative rock; indie rock
- Length: 47:25
- Label: EMI
- Producer: Dave Cooley

Birds of Tokyo chronology
This Fire (EP) (2012)	March Fires (2013)	Anchor (EP) (2015)

Singles from March Fires
- 1. "This Fire" Released: 5 October 2012; 2. "Lanterns" Released: 14 January 2013; 3. "When the Night Falls Quiet" Released: 22 April 2013

March Fires is the fourth studio album by the Australian alternative rock band Birds of Tokyo. It was released on 1 March 2013 in Australia, North American, and Europe, through EMI. It is the band's second major-label studio album release, after 2010's Birds of Tokyo and is also the first album by the band not to feature founding member Anthony Jackson, who left in 2011. His replacement, Ian Berney, makes his debut appearance on the album as the band's new bassist.

March Fires received positive reviews, and the album became the band's first number-one album on the ARIA Albums Chart. It also marked the group's international album chart debut, reaching number 26 in New Zealand.

== Recording ==
Birds of Tokyo began recording their fourth studio album in February 2012, which mostly took place in Los Angeles, California. The band recorded over a six-month period, lasting until July. Kingsize Studio and the Hobby Shop in Eagle Rock, along with the Sound Factory and Oceanway Studios in Hollywood hosted these sessions. A final weeklong session was conducted in October 2012 at the Hoop Hut in Sydney, before the album was completed, later that month. March Fires is the first album to feature bassist Ian Berney, after founding member and previous bassist Anthony Jackson left the band.

== Artwork ==
The artwork for March Fires and its singles was created by Australian graphic designer, art director, and album artist Leif Podhajsky. His work explores themes of connectedness, love, fear, magic, the relevance of nature, and psychedelic or altered experiences, and uses techniques such as pattern, recursion, balance, symmetry, and repetition. By utilizing these subjects, he attempts to "coerce the viewer into a realignment with themselves and their surroundings". Podhajsky's work has been described as "striking abstractions of nature – mirrored vistas, engulfing waves, rippling, melting cosmic landscapes". He had previously worked with other bands on albums such as the Vines', Future Primitive (2011) and Tame Impala's Innerspeaker (2010) and Lonerism (2012).

== Promotion ==
=== Singles ===
"This Fire" was released as the lead single from March Fires on 5 October 2012. An accompanying EP, featuring the album track "Boy" and the B-side "Glowing in the Streets", along with a March Fires cut entitled "The Lake", was also issued the same day. The music video was published the day before, on 4 October 2012.

"Lanterns" was released as the second single from the album on 14 January 2013. It has since become Birds of Tokyo's most successful single, peaking at number three on the Australian singles chart, the band's first top-ten single. It was also number one on the ARIA Australian artist singles chart for a total of nine weeks. Additionally, the song was certified platinum, having sold over 70,000 copies in Australia. The music video debuted on 17 January 2013 and was shot in Sydney.

"When the Night Falls Quiet" was promoted to Australian contemporary hit radio on 21 April 2013 as the third single from March Fires. An accompanying music video debuted on the same day.

== Critical reception ==
Professional ratings
Review scores
Source	Rating
Rip It Up	4.5/5
The Sydney Morning Herald	4/5 stars
Tom Magazine	4/5 stars
The West Australian	3/5 stars

March Fires received generally positive reviews. Sean Palmer of The Sydney Morning Herald gave the album a four-star review, stating that "March Fires is a gem and channels emotion but never to the point of nausea, leaving you feeling comfortable in the pleasant tones of a band that know what they are doing." He noted the stylistic similarities of the album to the band's previous work and wrote, "There is nothing here to shock or bewilder unless you are expecting Birds of Tokyo to return to their alt-rock origins with a hardened edge. If that's the case, you will be in for a jolt of disappointment, as beneath Kenny's words there is an astounding sense of positivity – as though one can climb that mountain, fix that bridge or restore faith." Simon Collins of The West Australian gave the album three stars, writing, "Synth-laden mid-album tracks "The Others" and "White Leaves" briefly revive listeners, before they are plunged into a downbeat run home to "Hounds"."

Rob Lyon of Adelaide street magazine Rip It Up wrote, "While this album has proved a popular move into a different direction for frontman Ian Kenny and his Birds, I hope they don't completely abandon their rock roots." in response to the light departure from the band's previous works. He praised the album as a singular piece, writing that "From start to end the album is a solid listening experience, offering more with every additional spin. The strength of March Fires is its consistency and how well it all hangs together, with nothing appearing out of place or disappointing. Some may focus on how much the songs sound the same, but for me this one is about taking in the whole experience rather than selected moments."

Tom Noyse of The Music gave the album a positive review, writing, "This newfound experimentation from Birds of Tokyo is fully apparent and it hits hard. The production is quite immaculate and is near the best they have yet created. March Fires is absolutely brilliant." Like other reviewers, he also noted the band's musical evolution and light departure from their previous works: "Progression is inevitable. To evolve in music, you need to keep ideas fresh and move forward. This is truly evident in the fourth album by Perth-bred alternative rockers Birds of Tokyo." Nick Linde of Tom Magazine also gave the album a positive review and also touched upon the difference of sound March Fires presented, writing, "The new album from West Australian band Birds of Tokyo has a little bit of old and a little bit of new." He noted that "March Fires delivers a strong anthemic feel, coupled with the sound from the band that has taken off over the last few years."

== Track listing ==
All songs are written and composed by Ian Berney, Ian Kenny, Glenn Sarangapany, Adam Spark, and Adam Weston.

No.	Title	Length
1.	"Liquid Arms"	3:53
2.	"This Fire"	4:47
3.	"When the Night Falls Quiet"	4:01
4.	"Motionless"	1:11
5.	"Lanterns"	4:22
6.	"The Others"	4:45
7.	"White Leaves"	7:49
8.	"Blume"	2:38
9.	"Boy"	5:00
10.	"Sirin"	5:18
11.	"Hounds"	3:41

== Personnel ==
Adapted from the March Fires liner notes:

Birds of Tokyo

- Ian Kenny – vocals, lyrics
- Adam Spark – guitars, keyboards, vocals
- Ian "White Goods" Berney – bass guitar
- Glenn Sarangapany – keyboards, synthesisers, vocals
- Adam Weston – drums, percussion

Other personnel

- Dave Cooley – producer
- Doug Boehm – engineer
- Hugo Nicholson – engineer
- Kristian Riley – additional engineer and editing
- Andrew Lynch – additional engineer
- Jared Hirshland – additional engineering and editing
- Chris Claypool – mix assistant
- Bryan Hall – guitar tech
- Leif Podhajsky – design and artwork
- Kane Hibberd – band photography

== Charts and certifications ==
=== Weekly charts ===
Chart (2013)	Peak position
Australian Albums (ARIA)	1
New Zealand Albums (RMNZ)	26

=== Year-end charts ===
Chart (2013)	Position
Australian Albums (ARIA)	37

=== Certifications ===
Region	Certification	Certified units/sales
Australia (ARIA)	Platinum	70,000^{^}
^{^} Shipments figures based on certification alone.

== Accolades ==
Year	Ceremony	Award	Result
2013	27th ARIA Music Awards	Album of the Year	Nominated
2013	27th ARIA Music Awards	Best Rock Album	Nominated

== Release history ==
Release history for March Fires
Country	Date	Format	Label
Australia	1 March 2013	Digital download, CD, LP	EMI
Belgium	1 March 2013	Digital download	EMI
Canada	1 March 2013	Digital download, CD	EMI
France	1 March 2013	Digital download	EMI
Germany	1 March 2013	Digital download	EMI
Ireland	1 March 2013	Digital download	EMI
Netherlands	1 March 2013	Digital download	EMI
New Zealand	1 March 2013	Digital download, CD, LP	EMI
United Kingdom	1 March 2013	Digital download, CD	EMI
United States	1 March 2013	Digital download, CD	EMI
