= Brace (song) =

Single by Birds of Tokyo

from the album Brace
- Released: 21 September 2016
- Length: 4:48
- Label: EMI
- Songwriter(s): Ian Kenny, Adam Spark, Adam Weston, Glenn Sarangapany, Ian Berney

Birds of Tokyo singles chronology
"I'd Go with You Anywhere" (2015)	"Brace" (2016)	"Empire" (2016)

Audio video
- "Brace" on YouTube

"Brace" is a song by Australian band, Birds of Tokyo. It was written by the group and released on 21 September 2016 as the lead single from the band's fifth studio album, Brace.

At the APRA Music Awards of 2018 the song won Rock Work of the Year.
