= This Orient =

Single by Foals

from the album Total Life Forever
- Released: 3 May 2010
- Genre: Indie rock
- Length: 4:02
- Label: Transgressive
- Songwriter(s): Jack Bevan, Edwin Congreave, Walter Gervers, Yannis Philippakis, Jimmy Smith

Foals singles chronology
"Spanish Sahara" (2010)	"This Orient" (2010)	"Miami" (2010)

"This Orient" is a song by British indie rock band Foals. It was released as the lead single from the band's second album, Total Life Forever. It was made available for digital download on 2 May 2010, and received a physical release the next day. The "Starkey remix" version of the song was used in Pro Evolution Soccer 2012.

The song is built around vocal samples, and the meaning behind the song is unclear.

The song peaked at number 97 on the UK Singles Chart.

== Track listing ==
7" single
No.	Title	Length
1.	"This Orient"	4:02
2.	"This Orient" (Starkey Remix)	4:42

7" single
No.	Title	Length
1.	"This Orient"	4:02
2.	"Spanish Sahara" (Chad Valley Remix)

Promo CD
No.	Title	Length
1.	"This Orient"	4:06
2.	"This Orient" (Radio Edit)	3:48
3.	"This Orient" (Instrumental)	4:03

Digital download
No.	Title	Length
1.	"This Orient"	4:02
2.	"This Orient" (Starkey Remix)	4:42
3.	"This Orient" (Warrior One Remix)	4:19
4.	"This Orient" (Astronomer Remix)	6:24
5.	"Spanish Sahara" (Mosca Remix)	7:32
6.	"Tron" (Kieran Hebden Version)	8:17

This Orient (Starkey Remix) Promo CD
No.	Title	Length
1.	"This Orient" (Starkey Remix)	4:42

== Charts ==
Chart (2010)	Peak position
Japan (Japan Hot 100)	71
Mexico Ingles Airplay (Billboard)	18
Scotland (OCC)	98
UK Singles (OCC)	97
