= The Greatest Mistakes =

Single by Birds of Tokyo

from the album Human Design
- Released: 16 August 2019
- Length: 2:36
- Label: Birds of Tokyo, EMI
- Songwriter(s): Ian Kenny: Adam Spark; Adam Weston; Ian Berney; Glenn Sarangapany

Birds of Tokyo singles chronology
| "Good Lord" (2019) | "The Greatest Mistakes" (2019) | "Two of Us" (2020) |

Music video
- "The Greatest Mistakes" on YouTube

"The Greatest Mistakes" is a song by Australian alternative rock band Birds of Tokyo and is the third single from their sixth studio album, Human Design. It was released on 16 August 2019.

Band member Ian Kenny said "The Greatest Mistakes" is cut from the same cloth as "Good Lord" saying "It's actually inspired by the same personal experience... but it's got the perspective of thankfully being a bit further down the road."

== Charts ==
| Chart (2019) | Peak position |
|---|---|
| Australian Digital Tracks (ARIA) | 21 |

== Certifications ==
| Region | Certification | Certified units/sales |
|---|---|---|
| Australia (ARIA) | Gold | 35,000^{‡} |
^{‡} Sales+streaming figures based on certification alone.
