= Birds of Tokyo =

Australian alternative rock band

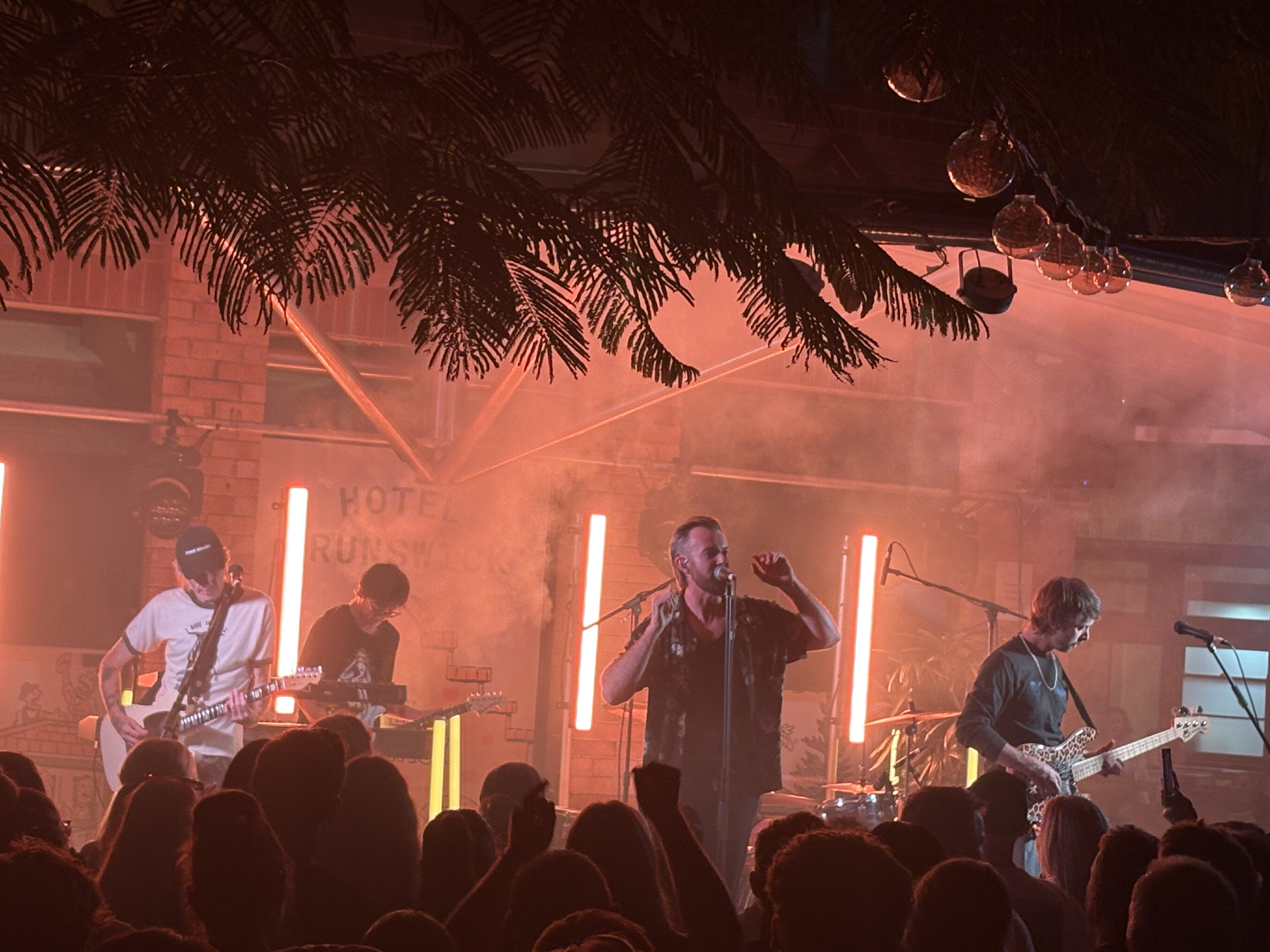
- Birds of Tokyo performing in 2026

Background information
- Origin: Perth, Australia
- Genre: Alternative rock
- Years active: 2004–present
- Label: EMI Australia
- Spinoff of: Karnivool, Tragic Delicate
- Members: Ian Kenny; Adam Spark; Ian Berney; Glenn Sarangapany; Michael Hardy
- Past members: Anthony Jackson; Adam Weston
- Website: birdsoftokyo.com

Birds of Tokyo are an Australian alternative rock band from Perth. Their debut album, Day One, gained them domestic success, reaching number three on the AIR Independent Album charts and spending a total of 36 consecutive weeks in the top ten.

In 2008, the band released Universes, which made it to number three on the Australian ARIA Albums Chart. 2010 saw their self-titled third studio release, Birds of Tokyo, spend over eight months on the Australian top 20, peaking at number two on the ARIA Albums Chart. The double-platinum album received the 2010 ARIA Award for Best Rock Album and in early 2011, the band's breakthrough hit "Plans" ranked number four on Triple J's Hottest 100. The album's follow-up single, "Wild at Heart", reached number one on the country's national airplay chart and won the band an APRA Award.

In 2013, Birds of Tokyo released their fourth studio album, March Fires. Supported by its first two singles, "This Fire" and "Lanterns", March Fires debuted at number one on the ARIA Albums Chart—the band's first number-one record. The album was certified gold within four weeks of release, and the triple-platinum single "Lanterns" was the most-played song on Australian radio for the first six months of 2013.

Birds of Tokyo released their fifth studio album, Brace, in November 2016. Their sixth record, Human Design, came out in April 2020 and topped the Australian charts upon its release.

== History ==
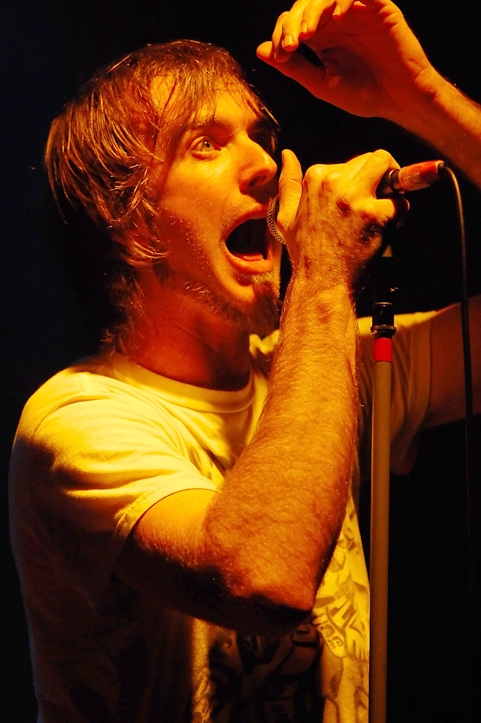
Birds of Tokyo vocalist Ian Kenny performing at the Fly by Night Club in 2008

=== 2004–2005: Early years ===
Birds of Tokyo formed in 2004 from a collaboration between members of the Perth bands Tragic Delicate and Karnivool, from which Ian Kenny came. The group formed after guitarist Adam Spark asked Kenny to sing on a handful of commercial demos. The pair were happy with the results and decided to form a band to release the songs themselves. They took their name from an article one member had read about the absence of birds in Tokyo's high-density central business district due to pollution and overcrowding. "We thought that was interesting, no birds in Tokyo – we thought, we'll be the birds of Tokyo", he says.

In January 2005, Birds of Tokyo released their debut EP, Birds of Tokyo. In October 2005, they issued the double A side single "One Way/Stay". It was recorded in Melbourne with producer Forrester Savell (Helmet, Full Scale, Karnivool).

=== 2006–2007: Day One ===
2006 saw the band playing shows across Western Australia on a three-week tour in January, before returning to Melbourne to finish working on their first album, Day One. The record was released on 3 February 2007 and debuted at No. 88 on the ARIA Albums Chart and No. 3 on the AIR albums chart.

Directly following the release, the band launched their Day One tour, playing in five capital cities around Australia. They also performed in the Perth leg of the 2007 Big Day Out and the Blackjack 2007 (the relocated Rock It festival).

Birds of Tokyo were nominated for two awards in the 2007 AIR Awards for Best Performing Independent Album and Most Outstanding New Independent Artist. The song "Wayside" was voted in at No. 61 in Triple J's Hottest 100 of 2007.

They were also recognized in Rolling Stone magazine as Artists to Watch in 2007.

=== 2008–2009: Universes ===
Birds of Tokyo recorded their second album, Universes, in Margaret River, Western Australia, and it was mixed in Los Angeles by Tim Palmer (Pearl Jam, Porcupine Tree). The debut single, "Silhouettic", was released as a free download on 14 April 2008. The record came out on 5 July 2008 and debuted at No. 3 on the ARIA Albums Chart and at No. 1 on the AIR albums chart.

The songs "Broken Bones", "Silhouettic", and "Wild Eyed Boy" were voted in at No. 20, No. 22 and No. 51, respectively, in the Triple J Hottest 100 of 2008.

The band subsequently played at the Big Day Out in 2009. Later that year, they embarked on the Broken Strings tour, which featured acoustic interpretations of a selection of their work, accompanied by a string quartet and grand piano and arranged by producer Anthony Cormican. They were supported by Glenn Richards, lead singer of Augie March. A CD and DVD featuring recordings from the tour was available to preorder at the shows and was released in early 2010 as The Broken Strings Tour. Birds of Tokyo were nominated for the 2009 Channel V Oz Artist of the Year.

=== 2010–2011: Birds of Tokyo ===
In early 2010, Birds of Tokyo returned to the studio to work on their eponymous third album. In March 2010, they released the single "The Saddest Thing I Know" and announced an Australian tour by the same name, alongside the New Zealand band Midnight Youth.The second single, "Plans", premiered on 20 June, and the album came out on 23 July. The band subsequently toured with Silversun Pickups in September and October 2010. "Plans" was voted at No. 4 in the Hottest 100 of 2010, while "Wild at Heart", the album's third single, and "The Saddest Thing I Know" also appeared at No. 47 and No. 87, respectively. The band also played at the Big Day Out in 2011, for their third time.

In March 2011, Birds of Tokyo announced via their Facebook page that bass player Anthony Jackson was leaving. Ian Berney from Sugar Army later filled the position.

The band were nominated in five different categories at the 2011 West Australian Music Industry Awards, including Most Popular Act, Most Popular Album, Best Male Vocalist, Best Instrumentalist, and Best Bassist. They won for Most Popular Album and Best Instrumentalist. They also received six 2010 ARIA Music Awards nominations.

In late April/early May 2011, Birds of Tokyo played at the annual Groovin' the Moo music festival alongside other Australian artists like Gotye, Washington, Art vs. Science, and Architecture in Helsinki.

During an interview on Radar Radio, Adam revealed that the band would be heading back into the studio to record their new album over the summer.

=== 2012–2014: March Fires ===
On 1 February 2012, Birds of Tokyo announced that they had finished writing their new album and would start recording the week after. Creating the record was a journey of "exploration and reinvention" for the band, telling the story of burning down the old and coming together to build something new. In October 2012, they released an EP titled This Fire, which featured the songs "This Fire" and "Boy". On 14 January 2013, "Lanterns" was issued as a single, with its video coming out on 8 February. The album, March Fires, came out on 1 March.

It debuted at No. 1 on the ARIA Albums Chart, making it the band's first No. 1 record. It was certified gold within four weeks of release, and the triple-platinum single "Lanterns" was the most-played song on Australian radio in the first six months of 2013. "When the Night Falls Quiet" was later released as a single, with its video coming out on 22 April.

Birds of Tokyo completed a tour of Australia to accompany the release as well as performing at the 2013 AFL Grand Final and Splendour in the Grass 2013. They were announced as the sole support for Muse on their national Australian tour in November and December of that year.

=== 2015–2017: Playlist and Brace ===
On 24 April 2015, Birds of Tokyo released their third EP, Anchor. This was supported by a national tour and a single of the same name. The band subsequently debuted a new song, "I'd Go with You Anywhere", confirming the release of a compilation album, titled Playlist, which came out in November 2015. The group issued their fifth studio album, Brace, in November 2016.

=== 2018–2020: Human Design ===
In September 2018, Birds of Tokyo released "Unbreakable". The song was chosen as the theme for the 2018 Invictus Games in Sydney. The band also performed the track at the closing ceremony of the event, on 27 October, at Sydney Super Dome. In February 2019, they issued "Good Lord" and followed it with "The Greatest Mistakes" and "Two of Us".

In February 2020, the AFL team West Coast Eagles revealed a revamped official club song, which was produced by bass player Ian Berney and sung by vocalist Ian Kenny.

In February 2020, the band announced the forthcoming release of their sixth studio album, Human Design, which came out in April 2020. The album debuted at number one on the ARIA charts, becoming the band's second chart topper. That November, they released a standalone single entitled "Weekend".

=== 2021–present: New singles ===
On 17 September 2021, Birds of Tokyo released "Superglue" with Stand Atlantic. The song was described as the "first taste of a new batch of tunes" the band have spent the past year working on.

On 18 March 2022, the band released "Smith Street", a song written during the 2021 COVID-19 lockdowns; it is an ode to the street in Melbourne of the same name.

On 18 November 2022, the band released the song "Daylight". They performed a run of shows with the Melbourne Symphony Orchestra in September 2023. In November 2023, they released the single "Lion".

== Band members ==
Current

- Ian Kenny – lead vocals (2004–present)
- Adam Spark – guitars, keyboards, backing vocals (2004–present)
- Ian Berney – bass (2011–present)
- Glenn Sarangapany – keyboards, synthesizers, backing vocals (2011–present)
- Michael Hardy – drums (2024–present)

Past

- Anthony Jackson – bass (2004–2011)
- Adam Weston – drums, percussion (2004–2024)

== Discography ==
- Day One (2007)
- Universes (2008)
- Birds of Tokyo (2010)
- March Fires (2013)
- Brace (2016)
- Human Design (2020)

== Awards and nominations ==
=== AIR Awards ===
The Australian Independent Record Awards (commonly known as the AIR Awards) is an annual awards night to recognise, promote, and celebrate the success of Australia's independent music sector.

| Year | Nominee / work | Award | Result |
|---|---|---|---|
| 2007 | Birds of Tokyo | Most Outstanding New Independent Artist | Nominated |
| 2007 | Day One | Best Performing Independent Album | Nominated |
| 2008 | Birds of Tokyo | Best Independent Artist | Won |
| 2008 | Universes | Best Independent Hard Rock/Punk Album | Nominated |
| 2010 | Birds of Tokyo | Most Popular Independent Artist | Nominated |

=== APRA Awards ===
The APRA Awards have been presented annually since 1982 by the Australasian Performing Right Association, "honouring composers and songwriters".

| Year | Nominee / work | Award | Result |
|---|---|---|---|
| 2011 | "Plans" (Anthony Jackson, Ian Kenny, Adam Spark, Adam Weston) | Breakthrough Songwriter of the Year | Nominated |
| 2011 | "Plans" (Anthony Jackson, Ian Kenny, Adam Spark, Adam Weston) | Most Played Australian Work | Nominated |
| 2011 | "Plans" (Anthony Jackson, Ian Kenny, Adam Spark, Adam Weston) | Rock Work of the Year | Nominated |
| 2011 | "Plans" (Anthony Jackson, Ian Kenny, Adam Spark, Adam Weston) | Song of the Year | Nominated |
| 2012 | "Wild at Heart" (Anthony Jackson, Ian Kenny, Adam Spark, Adam Weston) | Rock Work of the Year | Won |
| 2012 | "Wild at Heart" (Anthony Jackson, Ian Kenny, Adam Spark, Adam Weston) | Most Played Australian Work | Nominated |
| 2013 | "This Fire" (Ian Berney, Ian Kenny, Glen Sarangapany, Adam Spark, Adam Westonn) | Rock Work of the Year | Nominated |
| 2013 | "This Fire" (Ian Berney, Ian Kenny, Glen Sarangapany, Adam Spark, Adam Westonn) | Song of the Year | Shortlisted |
| 2014 | "Lanterns" (Ian Berney, Ian Kenny, Glenn Sarangapany, Adam Spark, Adam Weston) | Most Played Australian Work | Won |
| 2014 | "Lanterns" (Ian Berney, Ian Kenny, Glenn Sarangapany, Adam Spark, Adam Weston) | Rock Work of the Year | Won |
| 2014 | "Lanterns" (Ian Berney, Ian Kenny, Glenn Sarangapany, Adam Spark, Adam Weston) | Song of the Year | Nominated |
| 2014 | "When the Night Falls Quiet" (Ian Berney, Ian Kenny, Glen Sarangapany, Adam Spark, Adam Weston) | Rock Work of the Year | Nominated |
| 2016 | "Anchor" (Ian Berney, Ian Kenny, Glen Sarangapany, Adam Spark, Adam Weston) | Rock Work of the Year | Won |
| 2016 | "Anchor" (Ian Berney, Ian Kenny, Glen Sarangapany, Adam Spark, Adam Weston) | Song of the Year | Nominated |
| 2017 | "I'd Go with You Anywhere" (Berney, Kenny, Sarangapany, Spark, Weston) | Rock Work of the Year | Won |
| 2018 | "Brace" (Berney, Kenny, Sarangapany, Spark, Weston) | Rock Work of the Year | Won |
| 2020 | "Good Lord" (Berney, Kenny, Sarangapany, Spark, Adam Weston) | Most Performed Australian Work of the Year | Nominated |
| 2020 | "Good Lord" (Berney, Kenny, Sarangapany, Spark, Adam Weston) | Most Performed Alternative Work of the Year | Nominated |
| 2020 | "Good Lord" (Berney, Kenny, Sarangapany, Spark, Adam Weston) | Song of the Year | Shortlisted |
| 2021 | "Two of Us" (Berney, Kenny, Sarangapany, Spark, Weston) | Most Performed Alternative Work | Nominated |
| 2021 | "Two of Us" (Berney, Kenny, Sarangapany, Spark, Weston) | Song of the Year | Shortlisted |
| 2024 | "Daylight" (Berney, Kenny, Sarangapan, Spark, Weston) | Most Performed Alternative Work | Won |
| 2025 | "Lion" (Berney, Kenny, Sarangapany, Spark, Weston) | Most Performed Rock Work | Nominated |

=== ARIA Music Awards ===
The ARIA Music Awards is an annual awards ceremony that recognises excellence, innovation, and achievement across all genres of Australian music.

| Year | Nominee / work | Award | Result |
|---|---|---|---|
| 2010 | Birds of Tokyo | Best Rock Album | Won |
| 2010 | Birds of Tokyo | Album of the Year | Nominated |
| 2010 | "Plans" | Single of the Year | Nominated |
| 2010 | The Broken Strings Tour DVD | Best Music DVD | Nominated |
| 2010 | Birds of Tokyo | Most Popular Australian Artist | Eliminated |
| 2010 | Birds of Tokyo | Best Group | Nominated |
| 2011 | "Wild at Heart" | Best Group | Nominated |
| 2011 | "Wild at Heart" | Single of the Year | Nominated |
| 2011 | "Plans" | Highest Selling Single | Nominated |
| 2011 | Birds of Tokyo | Highest Selling Album | Nominated |
| 2011 | Birds of Tokyo | Most Popular Australian Live Act | Nominated |
| 2011 | Birds of Tokyo | Most Popular Australian Artist | Won |
| 2013 | March Fires | Album of the Year | Nominated |
| 2013 | March Fires | Best Group | Nominated |
| 2013 | March Fires | Best Rock Album | Nominated |
| 2013 | "Lanterns" | Song of the Year | Nominated |
| 2013 | "Lanterns" | Best Video | Nominated |
| 2013 | March Fires Tour | Best Australian Live Act | Nominated |
| 2019 | "Good Lord" | Best Group | Nominated |
| 2019 | "Good Lord" | Song of the Year | Nominated |

=== J Awards ===
The J Awards are an annual series of Australian music awards that were established by the Australian Broadcasting Corporation's youth-focused radio station Triple J in 2005.

| Year | Nominee / work | Award | Result |
|---|---|---|---|
| 2008 | Universes | Best Album | Nominated |

=== West Australian Music Industry Awards ===
The West Australian Music Industry Awards are annual awards presented to the domestic contemporary music industry, put on annually by the Western Australian Music Industry Association Inc.

| Year | Nominee / work | Award | Result (wins only) |
|---|---|---|---|
| 2007 | Birds of Tokyo | Favourite Newcomer | Won |
| 2007 | Ian Kenny | Best Male Vocalist | Won |
| 2008 | Day One | Most Popular Album | Won |
| 2008 | Birds of Tokyo | Best Rock Act | Won |
| 2009 | Universes | Most Popular Album | Won |
| 2009 | Birds of Tokyo | Most Popular Act | Won |
| 2009 | Birds of Tokyo | Best Popular Live Act | Won |
| 2009 | Birds of Tokyo | Best Rock Act | Won |
| 2009 | Ian Kenny | Best Male Vocalist | Won |
| 2010 | Birds of Tokyo | Most Popular Act | Won |
| 2010 | Ian Kenny | Best Male Vocalist | Won |
| 2011 | Birds of Tokyo | Most Popular Album | Won |
| 2011 | Glen Sarangapany | Best Instrumentalist | Won |
| 2013 | Ian Kenny | Male Vocalist of the Year | Won |
