= When the Night Falls Quiet =

Single by Birds of Tokyo

from the album March Fires
- Released: 22 April 2013
- Recorded: 2012
- Genre: Alternative rock
- Length: 4:01
- Label: EMI
- Songwriters: Ian Berney, Ian Kenny, Glenn Sarangapany, Adam Spark, Adam Weston
- Producer: Dave Cooley

Birds of Tokyo singles chronology
"Lanterns" (2012)	"When the Night Falls Quiet" (2013)	"Anchor" (2015)

Music video
- "When the Night Falls Quiet" on YouTube

"When the Night Falls Quiet" is the third single from Australian alternative rock band Birds of Tokyo's fourth album, March Fires. The song peaked at #43 on the Australian Singles Chart. The song was used for preview promos for the last few episodes of the second season of Revenge on Australia's Seven Network in 2013.

Single artwork and design is by Leif Podhajsky.

Band member Ian Berney said "I remember the day we wrote the chorus for "When The Night Falls Quiet". It all came out at once – it literally fell out of the sky - the creative sky - and into our laps within 15 minutes. We got so stoked on it, we went to the pub and had a few beers and we started singing it as a gang, the whole band. In hindsight, the chorus is actually this bizarre combination of "When The Saints Go Marching In", and "If I Could Turn Back Time" by Cher."

== Chart performance ==
"When the Night Falls Quiet" debuted on the ARIA Singles Chart at #53 on the issue dated 1 July 2013. It reached #43 on 8 July 2103. It also reached #9 on the ARIA Australian Singles Chart on 15 July 2013.

== Music video ==
The music video for "When the Night Falls Quiet" was directed by Josh Logue and was shot in Sydney, Australia.

== Charts ==
Chart (2013)	Peak position
Australia (ARIA)	43
