= Wild at Heart (Birds of Tokyo song) =

Single by Birds of Tokyo

from the album Birds of Tokyo
- Released: 17 December 2010
- Recorded: 2010
- Genre: Alternative rock
- Length: 4:00
- Label: EMI
- Songwriters: Birds of Tokyo (Anthony Jackson, Ian Kenny, Adam Spark, Adam Weston)
- Producers: Scott Horscroft, Adam Spark

Birds of Tokyo singles chronology
"Plans" (2010)	"Wild at Heart" (2010)	"Circles" (2011)

Music video
- "Wild at Heart" on YouTube

"Wild at Heart" is the third single from Australian alternative rock rock band, Birds of Tokyo's self-titled third album, Birds of Tokyo. The song peaked at No. 50 on the Australian Singles Chart in February 2011 and was certified gold. It was listed at No. 47 in Triple J Hottest 100, 2010. At the ARIA Music Awards of 2011, the song was nominated for Single of the Year, but lost to "Somebody That I Used to Know" by Gotye and Kimbra.

Band member Adam Spark recalled: "We were going through this real Beach Boys sort of how-clever-can-we-get-writing-phase through this record, and "Wild At Heart" was one of those ones “how much can you get a big ridiculous key change in there without anybody kind of noticing it?” The idea with things like that is to be able to sort of move a song around in such a crazy sort of way that gives you an interest but without anybody being able to tell, or not being able to sing it. You can sort of follow the lyric and melody quite easily having no musical knowledge, so we're a little bit proud of that."

== Track listing ==
Digital Download

1. "Wild at Heart" - 4:00
2. "Broken Bones" (The iTunes Sessions) – 4:03
3. "Wayside" (The iTunes Sessions) – 4:29
4. "Plans" (The iTunes Sessions) – 3:46

== Charts and certifications ==
=== Weekly charts ===
Chart (2011)	Peak position
Australia (ARIA)	50
Australian Artist Singles (ARIA)	6

== Certifications ==
Region	Certification	Certified units/sales
Australia (ARIA)	Gold	35,000^{^}
^{^} Shipments figures based on certification alone.

== Release history ==
Country	Date	Format
Australia	17 December 2010	Digital download
