= Good Lord (song) =

Single by Birds of Tokyo

from the album Human Design
- Released: 26 February 2019
- Length: 3:23
- Label: Birds of Tokyo, EMI
- Songwriter(s): Ian Kenny: Adam Spark; Adam Weston; Ian Berney; Glenn Sarangapany

Birds of Tokyo singles chronology
"Unbreakable" (2018)	"Good Lord" (2019)	"The Greatest Mistakes" (2019)

Music video
- "Good Lord" on YouTube

"Good Lord" is a song by Australian alternative rock band Birds of Tokyo and is the second single from their sixth studio album, Human Design. It was released on 26 February 2019.

Band member Ian Kenny said the song is about the break up of his marriage. Kenny explained: "I know I'm not the first person to go through it, and unfortunately I won't be the last, but it still hurt like hell and you can hear that in this song". He added: "It's the old story, You get married and you think you're gonna live happily ever after. But one day unexpectedly you see something that literally shatters your whole world. Then you have to spend years trying to put your head and heart back together."

An acoustic version of the song was released on 24 May 2019.

At the ARIA Music Awards of 2019, the song was nominated for two awards Best Group and Song of the Year.

At the APRA Music Awards of 2020, "Good Lord" was nominated for Most Performed Australian Work of the Year and Most Performed Alternative Work of the Year.

== Charts ==
=== Weekly charts ===
Chart (2019)	Peak position
Australia (ARIA)	19

=== Year-end charts ===
Chart (2019)	Position
Australia (ARIA)	74
Australian Artist (ARIA)	12

== Certifications ==
Region	Certification	Certified units/sales
Australia (ARIA)	4× Platinum	280,000^{‡}
^{‡} Sales+streaming figures based on certification alone.
