= The Saddest Thing I Know =

Single by Birds of Tokyo

from the album Birds of Tokyo
- Released: March 2010
- Recorded: 2010
- Genre: Alternative rock
- Length: 3:08
- Label: EMI
- Songwriters: Birds of Tokyo (Anthony Jackson, Ian Kenny, Adam Spark, Adam Weston)
- Producers: Adam Spark, Scott Horscroft

Birds of Tokyo singles chronology
"Head in My Hands" (2009)	"The Saddest Thing I Know" (2010)	"Plans" (2010)

Music video
- "The Saddest Thing I Know" on YouTube

"The Saddest Thing I Know" is the first single from Australian alternative rock band Birds of Tokyo's self-titled third album, Birds of Tokyo. It was the first released under new label EMI Music Australia. The song because their first ARIA Chart song, peaked at #66 in May 2010. It was voted #87 in Triple J's Hottest 100 countdown of 2010.

Band member Adam Spark said: ""The Saddest Thing I Know" was a funny one, we’re not really sure where it came from, it’s sort of like this bluesy, drug trip – hence the really sort of weird video. We had these dancing geisha girls/stripper neon acid thing going on. We ended up recording the piano three times for that one because every time we’d open the door to the studio, snow would come in as we were in the middle of winter in Sweden, and it kept ruining all the tracks and everything wouldn’t line up with it. It was a cold one, a very cold one, that one."

== Track listing ==
Digital Download

1. "The Saddest Thing I Know" - 3:08

== Charts and certifications ==
=== Weekly charts ===
Chart (2010)	Peak position
Australian Singles (ARIA)	66
Australian Artist Singles (ARIA)	15
