= Birds of Tokyo (EP) =

EP by Birds of Tokyo
- Released: 8 January 2005
- Recorded: 2004–05
- Studio: Perth
- Genre: Alternative
- Length: 16:35
- Label: Egg/MGM
- Producer: Adam Spark; Birds of Tokyo

Birds of Tokyo chronology
Birds of Tokyo (2005)	Day One (2007)

Birds of Tokyo is the debut four-track extended play from Australian alternative rockers, Birds of Tokyo, which was released in January 2005 on independent label, Egg Records, through MGM Distribution.

== Background ==
In 2004 Adam Spark, a Perth guitarist, approached local hard rockers, Karnivool's lead singer, Ian Kenny, to provide vocals for some demos he wanted to record for publication rights. They decided to start a side project, Birds of Tokyo, to record the material and recruited Anthony Jackson on bass guitar and Adam Weston on drums from fellow Perth group, Tragic Delicate. They released a self-titled four-track extended play as their debut in January 2005 on independent label Egg Records, which was distributed by MGM Distribution.

== Track listing ==
1. "Russian Roulette" (Adam Spark, Ian Kenny) – 3:38
2. "Pedestal" (Spark, Kenny) – 4:40
3. "Believer" (Spark, Kenny) – 4:01
4. "Untitled" (Note: The name of the track is "Untitled") (Spark, Kenny) – 4:16
