= Anchor (Birds of Tokyo song) =

Single by Birds of Tokyo

from the album Anchor
- Released: 24 April 2015
- Recorded: Los Angeles, 2014
- Genre: Alternative rock
- Length: 3:36
- Label: Birds of Tokyo; EMI
- Songwriters: Ian Berney, Ian Kenny, Glenn Sarangapany, Adam Spark, Adam Weston

Birds of Tokyo singles chronology
"When the Night Falls Quiet" (2013)	"Anchor" (2015)	"I'd Go with You Anywhere" (2015)

Music video
- "Anchor" on YouTube

"Anchor" is a song by the Australian alternative rock band Birds of Tokyo, released as part of the 2015 EP of the same name. The track came in at number 72 on the Triple J Hottest 100, 2015.

Birds of Tokyo vocalist Ian Kenny said, "This is a song the band wrote while we were overseas touring and doing our thing. One thing we realised is that when you spend so long away from your friends and family and the people you love, you can kind of lose touch with exactly how people are doing and what's really going on in their world, with a varied set of outcomes — some good, some bad. So this is homage, bit of a tribute song to the times we didn't notice how the people we love were really doing."

== Reviews ==
Jamie Parmenter from Renowned for Sound said: ""Anchor" builds in with sombre tones and snaps to create images of California embodied in music. Front man Ian Kenny has really thrown himself in the deep end here, creating a sound that's almost like homage to early 80's American rock. This is all set against heartbreaking lyrics of chasing ghosts and finding loneliness, creating a track of strange but satisfying presence."

== Music video ==
The official music video for "Anchor" was released on 10 May 2015 An additional music video came out on VEVO on 2 July, showing the band performing the song live in the studio.

== Track listing ==
Digital download

1. "Anchor" – 3:36
