= This Fire (Birds of Tokyo song) =

Single by Birds of Tokyo

from the EP This Fire
- Released: 5 October 2012
- Recorded: 2012
- Genre: Alternative rock
- Length: 4:52
- Label: Birds of Tokyo, EMI Records
- Songwriters: Ian Kenny, Adam Spark, Ian Berney, Glenn Sarangapany, Adam Weston
- Producer: Dave Cooley

Birds of Tokyo singles chronology
"Circles" (2011)	"This Fire" (2012)	"Lanterns" (2013)

Music video
- "This Fire" on YouTube

"This Fire" is a song written and recorded by Australian alternative rock band Birds of Tokyo. It was included on their third extended play (EP) of the same name and for their fourth studio album, March Fires (2013). The song appears as the second track on the album. The Single artwork is by Leif Podhajsky. The song came in at number 51 on the Triple J Hottest 100, 2012. Sales towards "This Fire" counted towards the EP which peaked at number 32 and was certified gold in 2013.

Band member Ian Berney said ""This Fire" was probably one of the most effortless songs I've ever been part of a writing team for. I'll never forget the night that chorus came out – imagine five guys with one acoustic guitar, singing the song at the top of their lungs and all getting super excited. I like how the lyrics assign responsibility to ourselves for the urban disasters that we’ve created. Live, it’s one of the strongest… 9 times out of 10 we play it last; it just finishes a set with such command - probably a favourite for the whole band."

== Reviews ==
Jason Strange from The AU Review said; ""This Fire" is the lead single... and has Ian Kenny's trademark voice and lyrical poetry, picking up nicely from where they left off with the last record. Judging by this, they have another number one album on the way."

== Music video ==
The music video for "This Fire" was directed by Kris Moyes. The video features several abstract art pieces, including buildings, landscapes, and warped bodies, all slowly catching fire. As of April 2020, the video has over 500,000 views on YouTube.

== Track listing ==
Digital download
No.	Title	Length
1.	"This Fire"	4:52

== Certifications ==
Certifications for "This Fire"
Region	Certification	Certified units/sales
Australia (ARIA)	Platinum	70,000^{‡}
^{‡} Sales+streaming figures based on certification alone.
