= Universes (album) =

Studio album by Birds of Tokyo
- Released: 5 July 2008
- Recorded: 2008
- Genre: Alternative rock, post-grunge
- Length: 40:23
- Label: Independent/MGM Distribution
- Producer: Adam Spark; Birds of Tokyo

Birds of Tokyo chronology
Day One (2007)	Universes (2008)	The Broken Strings Tour (2010)

Singles from Universes
- 1. "Silhouettic" Released: 14 April 2008; 2. "Broken Bones" Released: 2008; 3. "Wild Eyed Boy" Released: 2008; 4. "Head in My Hands" Released: 2009

Universes is the second album from Birds of Tokyo, independently released on 5 July 2008, through MGM Distribution. The album was recorded at Loop Studios in West Perth, Wing Command in Perth, Western Australia and in "a big beautiful wooden house by the sea" at Injidup (Yallingup, Western Australia).

Mixing for the album took place in North Hollywood, California by Tim Palmer at Ameraycan Studios. During this mixing process the band filmed the music videos for "Broken Bones" and "Silhouettic" in Lancaster, California. These two music videos join together to form one complete story. However, the video for "Silhouettic", which features the second part of the story, was released first on the band's official website and their official Myspace page.

The debut single from the album, "Silhouettic", was released as a free download from the band's official website on 14 April 2008.

At the J Awards of 2008, the album was nominated for Australian Album of the Year.

The third single off the album, "Wild Eyed Boy", received significant airplay and was shown on Channel V.

Universes produced three songs on the Triple J Hottest 100, 2008 with "Wild Eyed Boy" at number 51, "Silhouettic" at number 22 and "Broken Bones" at number 20.

Professional ratings
Review scores
Source	Rating
Access All Areas	positive link
Beat	positive link
Sputnikmusic	link
Triple J	positive link
Web Wombat	link

== Track listing ==
No.	Title	Length
1.	"Uno"	0:53
2.	"Broken Bones"	3:46
3.	"Wild Eyed Boy"	2:59
4.	"Silhouettic"	3:24
5.	"Head in My Hands"	4:12
6.	"White Witch"	3:18
7.	"An Ode to Death"	2:56
8.	"Armour for Liars"	4:14
9.	"The Baker's Son"	6:19
10.	"Train Wrecks"	4:59
11.	"Medicine"	3:25

iTunes bonus track
No.	Title	Length
12.	"Wayside" (acoustic mix)	4:56

Bonus DVD
No.	Title	Length
1.	"Broken Bones" (music video)
2.	"Silhouettic" (music video)
3.	"Making of the Clips" (video)
4.	"Making of "Universes" (video)

== Charts ==
=== Weekly charts ===
Chart (2008)	Peak position
Australian Albums (ARIA)	3

== Certifications ==
Region	Certification	Certified units/sales
Australia (ARIA)	Gold	35,000^{^}
^{^} Shipments figures based on certification alone.

== Personnel ==
- Ian Kenny – vocals
- Adam Spark – guitars, vocals, keyboards
- Adam Weston – drums, percussion
- Anthonny Jackson – bass

== Credits ==
- Produced by Adam Spark and Birds of Tokyo
- Engineered by Kieran Kenderessy and Adam Spark
- Mixed by Tim Palmer at Ameraycan Studios, North Hollywood, California
- Distributed by MGM Distribution Australia
