= 2018 Invictus Games =

Invictus Games – Sydney 2018
- Host city: Sydney, Australia
- Motto: Game On Down Under
- Nations: 18
- Debuting countries: 1
- Athletes: ~500
- Opening: 20 October 2018
- Closing: 27 October 2018
- Opened by: Prince Harry, Duke of Sussex
- Main venue: Sydney Olympic Park
- Website: Official website

The 2018 Invictus Games was an adaptive multi-sport event for wounded, injured and ill veteran and active defence personnel, held in Sydney, New South Wales, Australia. The fourth Invictus Games, an event founded in 2014 by Prince Harry, Duke of Sussex, included 13 sports (11 medal sports). It was the first Invictus Games held in the southern hemisphere.

== Development and preparation ==
=== Venues ===
The events were staged on and around Sydney Harbour and at Sydney Olympic Park, in venues used for the 2000 Summer Olympics.

- Cockatoo Island – Jaguar Land Rover Driving Challenge
- Genea Netball Centre – Sitting Volleyball pool matches, Powerlifting heats and finals.
- Quaycentre – Sitting Volleyball semi-finals and finals, Wheelchair Rugby pool matches, semi-finals and finals, Wheelchair Basketball pool matches, semi-finals and finals.
- Qudos Bank Arena – Closing Ceremony
- Farm Cove / Royal Botanic Garden, Sydney – Sailing heats and finals, Road Cycling
- Sydney Olympic Park Aquatic Centre – Swimming heats and finals
- Sydney Olympic Park Athletic Centre – Athletics
- Sydney Olympic Park Hockey Centre – Archery
- NSW Tennis Centre – Wheelchair Tennis
- Sydney Opera House – Opening Ceremony

=== Funding ===
Jaguar Land Rover was the Presenting Partner for 2018 Sydney Invictus Games, as it had been for the Invictus Games since its inception in London in 2014. Premier Partners were Fisher House Foundation, Medibank, Sage Group, UNSW Canberra and Westpac. Aon, Boeing, Defence Housing Australia, Fidelity, Hyatt Regency Sydney, icare, ISPS Handa, Leidos, Lockheed Martin, Minter Ellison, Raytheon, Royal Australian Mint, SAAB Australia, Ticketek, Unisys and Workwear Group were Official supporters. The event Official suppliers were Amazon, Accor, CSM Live, George P. Johnson, Gold Medal Systems, Goodman, Great Big Events, Harvey Norman, Isentia, Norwest, Ottobock, Pages and Technical Direction Company. The Packer Family Foundation was a Philanthropic Supporter. Founding Partners were the Australian Defence Force, Deloitte, Legacy NSW, Clubs NSW and RSL NSW. The Australian government donated $10,000 to the Games to mark the occasion of the wedding of Prince Harry and Meghan Markle.

== The Games ==
=== Participating nations ===
All 17 countries from the 2017 Games were invited to attend, with Poland joining for the first time, for a total of 18 countries.

- Afghanistan
- Australia (host)
- Canada
- Denmark
- Estonia
- France
- United Kingdom
- Georgia
- Germany
- Iraq
- Italy
- Jordan
- Netherlands
- New Zealand
- Poland
- Romania
- Ukraine
- United States

Another team titled "Unconquered" also participated in certain events consisting of competitors from multiple nations.

Source: "Competitors". 2018 Sydney Invictus Games. Archived from the original on 19 October 2018.

=== Sports ===
There were 12 adaptive sports contested at the Games (with golf and wheelchair tennis as non-medal sports) as well as the Jaguar Land Rover Driving Challenge.

- Archery (9)
- Athletics (61)
- Golf
- Indoor rowing (21)
- Powerlifting (6)
- Road cycling (20)
- Sailing (2)
- Sitting volleyball (1)
- Swimming (30)
- Wheelchair basketball (1)
- Wheelchair rugby (1)
- Wheelchair tennis
- Jaguar Land Rover Driving Challenge (1)

==== Wheelchair rugby ====
Wheelchair rugby was held at the Quaycentre over a two-day period from 24 to 25 October. Men and women competed in mixed teams. Competitors from 6 nations competed in wheelchair rugby at the 2018 Invictus Games.

- Australia (11)
- France (12)
- Great Britain (8)
- New Zealand (11)
- Unconquered (13)
- United States (11)

==== Sitting volleyball ====
Sitting volleyball was held at the Quaycentre over a two-day period from 22 to 23 October. One event took place, which was jointly staged at the Genea Netball Centre and Quaycentre. Teams from 12 nations competed in this event.

- Afghanistan (4)
- Australia (13)
- Estonia
- France
- Great Britain
- Georgia
- Germany
- Jordan
- Netherlands
- Poland
- Romania
- United States

== Medal table ==
There is no competitive medal tally at the Invictus Games. Medals are awarded, but Invictus Games does not endorse or maintain an official scoreboard of gold, silver and bronze medals.

Competitors, not athletes, participate in the event that supports rehabilitation and recovery for wounded, injured and ill defence personnel and veterans.

== Medalists ==
=== Archery ===
Event	Gold	Silver	Bronze
Men's novice recurve	Darren Peters; Australia	Oleksandr Zozuliak; Ukraine	Kenneth Jepsen Hyldtoft; Denmark
Men's open recurve	Eugen-Valentin Pătru; Romania	Fabio Tomasulo; Italy	Bonaventura Bove; Italy
Women's novice recurve	Maiia Moskvych; Ukraine	Nikki Murillo; Canada	Cavell Simmonds; Canada
Women's open recurve	Jennifer Collins; United Kingdom	Jocelyn McKinley; Australia	Hannah Marguerite Stolberg; United States
Team novice recurve	Ukraine; Maiia Moskvych; Serhii Shymchak; Andrii Usach	Denmark; Christian Claydon-Smith; Morten Bach Jensen; Anker Sewohl	France; Cyril Auxant; Luc Berton; Jean-François Montoya
Team open recurve	Italy; Bonaventura Bove; Piero Rosario Suma; Fabio Tomasulo	Romania; Danut Nicola; Ion-Catalin Pârvu; Eugen-Valentin Pătru	United Kingdom; Jennifer Collins; Scott McNeice; Poppy Pawsey
Men's open compound	Stewart Sherman; Australia	Steven Sandman; Australia	Dorin Petrut; Romania
Women's open compound	Christina Truesdale; United States	not awarded	not awarded
Team open compound	Romania; Ionut-Claudiu Butoi; Augustin-Nicuşor Pegulescu; Dorin Petrut	Australia; Matt Blunt; Garry Robinson; Steven Sandman	Canada; Derek Anderson; Mathew Belear; Frank Gauvin

=== Athletics ===
Men

Event	Class	Gold	Silver	Bronze
100 m	IT1	Kushal Limbu; United Kingdom	Stix Parker; Australia	Alex Tate; United Kingdom
200 m	IT1	Kushal Limbu; United Kingdom	Stix Parker; Australia	Michael Sousadocarma; United States
400 m	IT1	Stix Parker; Australia	Ben Seekell; United States	Mickael Ranchin; France
1500 m	IT1	Andrew Wilkinson; Australia	Mickael Ranchin; France	Ben Seekell; United States
Long jump	IJ1	Alex Tate; United Kingdom	Stix Parker; Australia	Ben Seekell; United States
Shot put	IF1	Michael Sousadocarma; United States	Yurii Dmytrenko; Ukraine	Nu Filo-Leaana; New Zealand
Discus throw	IF1	Michael Sousadocarma; United States	Yurii Dmytrenko; Ukraine	Ott Jõesaar; Estonia
Shot put	IF2	Waad Imran Faris; Iraq	Mike Kacer; United States	not awarded
Discus throw	IF2	Waad Imran Faris; Iraq	Mike Kacer; United States	Rene Hinrikus; Estonia
100 m	IT3	Nathan Parker; Australia	Joe Dillnut; United Kingdom	Mike Kacer; United States
200 m	IT3	Fadhil Razzaq Abdulameer; Iraq	Mike Kacer; United States	Joe Dillnut; United Kingdom
400 m	IT3	Mike Kacer; United States	Nathan Parker; Australia	Joe Dillnut; United Kingdom
1500 m	IT3	Craig Wilson; New Zealand	Luuk Veltink; Netherlands	Mike Kacer; United States
Long jump	IJ3	Joe Dillnut; United Kingdom	Michael Lyddiard; Australia	not awarded
Shot put	IF3	Dorian Gardner; United States	not awarded	not awarded
Discus throw	IF3	Dorian Gardner; United States	Odai Majed Alshatnawi; Jordan	not awarded
100 m	IT4	Matthew Brumby; Australia	Joshua David Smith; United States	Ryan Patrick Novack; United States
200 m	IT4	Matthew Brumby; Australia	Joshua David Smith; United States	Ryan Patrick Novack; United States
400 m	IT4	Matthew Brumby; Australia	Joshua David Smith; United States	Ryan Patrick Novack; United States
1500 m	IT4	Matthew Brumby; Australia	Joshua David Smith; United States	Ryan Patrick Novack; United States
Long jump	IJ4	Iyad Salem Mestarehi; Jordan	not awarded	not awarded
Shot put	IF4	Rob Hufford; United States	Oleksandr Bielobokov; Ukraine	Jaime Garza; United States
Discus throw	IF4	Damien Irish; Australia	Rob Hufford; United States	Darren Young; United Kingdom
100 m	IT5	Ahmad Hashem Albarahmeh; Jordan	Sebastien Pradalier; France	Joel Rodriguez; United States
100 m	IT5	Malcolm Rose; United Kingdom	Sebastien Pradalier; France	Joel Rodriguez; United States
200 m	IT5	Sebastien Pradalier; France	Malcolm Rose; United Kingdom	Joel Rodriguez; United States
400 m	IT5	Sebastien Pradalier; France	Malcolm Rose; United Kingdom	not awarded
1500 m	IT5	Sebastien Pradalier; France	not awarded	not awarded
Long jump	IJ5	Benjamin Yeomans; Australia	Vasyl Omelchenko; Ukraine	Daniel Hendriock; Germany
Shot put	IF5	Martin Tye; United Kingdom	David Crook; United States	Tyson Schmidt; United States
Discus throw	IF5	David Crook; United States	Tyson Schmidt; United States	Pete Brown; Australia
Shot put	IF6	David Watson; United Kingdom	Ryan Pinney; United States	Mark Ormrod; United Kingdom
Discus throw	IF6	David Watson; United Kingdom	Tim Payne; United States	Mark Ormrod; United Kingdom
100 m	IT7	Benjamin Yeomans; Australia	Hayel Kalaif Al Mahakim; Jordan	Kenny Guinn; United States
200 m	IT7	Benjamin Yeomans; Australia	Hayel Kalaif Al Mahakim; Jordan	Steven Bortle; United States
400 m	IT7	Vasyl Omelchenko; Ukraine	Ergo Mets; Estonia	Hayel Kalaif Al Mahakim; Jordan
1500 m	IT7	Bogdan Oksentiuk; Ukraine	Karl Hinett; United Kingdom	Steve Sebburn; United Kingdom
Shot put	IF7	Ryan Major; United States	Massimo Sapio; Italy	Sua Tui; United States
Discus throw	IF7	Ryan Major; United States	Joel Rodriguez; United States	not awarded

Women

Event	Class	Gold	Silver	Bronze
100 m	IT1	Monica Contrafatto; Italy	not awarded	not awarded
200 m	IT1	Danielle Nichole Pothoof; United States	not awarded	not awarded
Shot put	IF1	Emma McCormick; United Kingdom	Stephanie Johnson; United States	not awarded
Discus throw	IF1	Emma McCormick; United Kingdom	not awarded	not awarded
100 m	IT3	Sabrina Daulaus; France	not awarded	not awarded
200 m	IT3	Sabrina Daulaus; France	not awarded	not awarded
400 m	IT3	Sabrina Daulaus; France	not awarded	not awarded
100 m	IT4	Gabriel Graves-Wake; United States	Brandi Evans; United States	Naomi Adie; United Kingdom
200 m	IT4	Gabriel Graves-Wake; United States	Brandi Evans; United States	Kristen Elizabeth Morris; United States
400 m	IT4	Gabriel Graves-Wake; United States	Brandi Evans; United States	Kristen Elizabeth Morris; United States
1500 m	IT4	Gabriel Graves-Wake; United States	Kristen Elizabeth Morris; United States	Naomi Adie; United Kingdom
Shot put	IF4	Brigid Baker; Australia	Joyce van den Waardenburg; Netherlands	Rebecca Kuenstner; Australia
Discus throw	IF4	Brigid Baker; Australia	Vanessa Broughill; Australia	Joyce van den Waardenburg; Netherlands
100 m	IT5	Amany Akram Abdel Rahman; Jordan	not awarded	not awarded
Long jump	IJ5	Heidi Joosten; Australia	Francesca Rocca; France	Vanessa Broughill; Australia
Shot put	IF5	Sebastiana Lopez; United States	Gabriel Graves-Wake; United States	Kristen Elizabeth Morris; United States
Discus throw	IF5	Sebastiana Lopez; United States	Brandi Evans; United States	Gabriel Graves-Wake; United States
100 m	IT7	Heidi Joosten; Australia	Dawn Maria Page; United States	Alexia Vlahos; Australia
200 m	IT7	Heidi Joosten; Australia	Dawn Maria Page; United States	Francesca Rocca; France
400 m	IT7	Heidi Joosten; Australia	Francesca Rocca; France	Dawn Maria Page; United States
1500 m	IT7	Annelies Homma; Netherlands	Debbie O'Connell; United Kingdom	Tanja Sunekær; Denmark
4 × 100 m relay		United States; Linn Aubrey Dillard; Gabriel Graves-Wake; Stephanie Johnson; Dawn Maria Page	United Kingdom; Naomi Adie; Kelly Ganfield; Alexandra McClellan; Debbie O'Connell	not awarded

Mixed

Event	Gold	Silver	Bronze
4 × 100 m relay	Australia; Matt Model; Nathan Parker; Stix Parker; Benjamin Yeomans	United Kingdom; Joe Dillnut; Kushal Limbu; Daniel Majid; Alex Tate	France; Benjamin Bouquet; Guillaume Ducrocq; Jean-Philippe Golf; Mickael Ranchin

=== Indoor rowing ===
Men

Event	Class	Gold	Silver	Bronze
One-minute sprint	IR1	Mark Ormrod; United Kingdom	David Watson; United Kingdom	Ryan Major; United States
Four-minute endurance	IR1	Mark Ormrod; United Kingdom	David Watson; United Kingdom	not awarded
One-minute sprint	IR2	Rémy Boullé; France	Dave Innes; Canada	Loreto Di Loreto; Italy
Four-minute endurance	IR2	Franck Robin; France	Loreto Di Loreto; Italy	Sebastien Pradalier; France
One-minute sprint	IR3	Oleksandr Bielobokov; Ukraine	Nathan Parker; Australia	David Travadon; France
Four-minute endurance	IR3	Nathan Parker; Australia	Luuk Veltink; Netherlands	John Elliott Ayo; United States
One-minute sprint	IR4	Martin Tye; United Kingdom	Pete Brown; Australia	Matthew Grashen; United States
Four-minute endurance	IR4	Pete Brown; Australia	Daniel Phillips; United Kingdom	Mark Daniels; Australia
One-minute sprint	IR5	Ross Alewine; United States	Mark Perkins; United Kingdom	Poul Overgaard Christensen; Denmark
Four-minute endurance	IR5	Ross Alewine; United States	Mark Perkins; United Kingdom	Ergo Mets; Estonia
One-minute sprint	IR6	Ben Farinazzo; Australia	Matt Model; Australia	Rob Hufford; United States
One-minute sprint	IR6	Serhii Ilnytskyi; Ukraine	Matt Model; Australia	Rob Hufford; United States
Four-minute endurance	IR6	Ben Farinazzo; Australia	Matt Model; Australia	Dumitru-Nicolae Paraschiva; Romania

Women

Event	Class	Gold	Silver	Bronze
One-minute sprint	IR2	Amany Akram Abdel Rahman; Jordan	not awarded	not awarded
One-minute sprint	IR3	Sabrina Daulaus; France	not awarded	not awarded
One-minute sprint	IR3	Rachel Williamson; United Kingdom	not awarded	not awarded
Four-minute endurance	IR3	Hannah Marguerite Stolberg; United States	not awarded	not awarded
Four-minute endurance	IR3	Rachel Williamson; United Kingdom	not awarded	not awarded
One-minute sprint	IR4	Sebastiana Lopez; United States	not awarded	not awarded
Four-minute endurance	IR4	Sebastiana Lopez; United States	not awarded	not awarded
One-minute sprint	IR5	Emily Mysko; Australia	Kristen Elizabeth Morris; United States	Marion Blot; France
Four-minute endurance	IR5	Emily Mysko; Australia	Kristen Elizabeth Morris; United States	Marion Blot; France
One-minute sprint	IR6	Tiff White; Australia	Emma Kadziolka; Australia	Sarah Petchell; Australia
Four-minute endurance	IR6	Emma Kadziolka; Australia	Tiff White; Australia	Sarah Petchell; Australia

=== Jaguar Land Rover driving challenge ===
Event	Gold	Silver	Bronze
Team	France; Cédric Arci; Mickaël Ranchin	Australia; Craig McGrath; Scott Reynolds	United Kingdom; Daniel Bingley; Mark Perkins

=== Powerlifting ===
Event	Class	Gold	Silver	Bronze
Men's lightweight	IP4	Ahmad Hashem Albarahmeh; Jordan	Kenny Guinn; United States	Lee Matthews; United Kingdom
Men's midweight	IP5	Oleksandr Havrylenko; Ukraine	Tyronne Gawthorne; Australia	Jonathan Mitchell; United Kingdom
Men's heavyweight	IP6	Martin Tye; United Kingdom	Yevhen Oleksenko; Ukraine	Rob Hufford; United States
Women's lightweight	IP1	Sarah Sliwka; Australia	Francesca Rocca; France	Abbie Kasparis; United Kingdom
Women's midweight	IP2	Sebastiana Lopez; United States	Nicki Bradley; Australia	Alexia Vlahos; Australia
Women's heavyweight	IP3	Sarah Petchell; Australia	Tiff White; Australia	Brigid Baker; Australia

=== Road cycling ===
Men

Event	Class	Gold	Silver	Bronze
Hand bike time trial	IHB1	Ryan Pinney; United States	Loreto Di Loreto; Italy	Sebastien Pradalier; France
Hand bike criterium	IHB1	Ryan Pinney; United States	Franck Robin; France	Sebastien Pradalier; France
Recumbent bike time trial	IRECB1	Daniel Lee; United States	Joshua David Smith; United States	John Elliott Ayo; United States
Recumbent bike criterium	IRECB1	Daniel Lee; United States	Joshua David Smith; United States	John Elliott Ayo; United States
Road cycling time trial	IRB1	David Travadon; France	Arnaud Sallembien; France	Edwin De Wolf; Netherlands
Road cycling criterium	IRB1	David Travadon; France	Arnaud Sallembien; France	Edwin De Wolf; Netherlands
Hand bike time trial	IHB2	Michael Swain; United Kingdom	Brant Ireland; United States	Remy Boullé; France
Hand bike criterium	IHB2	Michael Swain; United Kingdom	Brant Ireland; United States	Massimo Chiappetta; Italy
Road cycling time trial	IRB2	Steve Sebburn; United Kingdom	Karl Allen-Dobson; United Kingdom	Wayne Harrod; United Kingdom
Road cycling criterium	IRB2	Nicolas Mélen; France	Andrew Wilkinson; Australia	Steve Sebburn; United Kingdom
Road cycling time trial	IRB3	Andrew White; United Kingdom	Tim Grover; Australia	Denys Fishchuk; Ukraine
Road cycling criterium	IRB3	Andrew White; United Kingdom	Tim Grover; Australia	Alex Moulder; United Kingdom

Women

Event	Class	Gold	Silver	Bronze
Recumbent bike time trial	IRECB1	Debbie O'Connell; United Kingdom	Jamie Lyn Biviano; United States	Hannah Marguerite Stolberg; United States
Recumbent bike criterium	IRECB1	Debbie O'Connell; United Kingdom	Jamie Lyn Biviano; United States	Hannah Marguerite Stolberg; United States
Hand bike time trial	IHB2	Gabriel Graves-Wake; United States	not awarded	not awarded
Hand bike criterium	IHB2	Gabriel Graves-Wake; United States	not awarded	not awarded
Road cycling time trial	IRB2	Kristen Elizabeth Morris; United States	Emily Mysko; Australia	Christina Truesdale; United States
Road cycling criterium	IRB2	Kristen Elizabeth Morris; United States	Emily Mysko; Australia	Christina Truesdale; United States
Road cycling time trial	IRB3	Brandi Evans; United States	Stephanie Verhoef; Netherlands	Naomi Fong; Canada
Road cycling criterium	IRB3	Brandi Evans; United States	Linn Aubrey Dillard; United States	Naomi Fong; Canada

=== Sailing ===
Event	Gold	Silver	Bronze
Hansa Dinghy	Cyrille Chahboune; France	Davin Bretherton; Australia	Pete Arbuckle; Australia
Elliott 7 team	Australia; Paul Langley; Craig McGrath; Rob Saunders; Marcus Wilson	Denmark; Joakim Juul Eriksen; Johan Høeg Hansen; Trine Holst Jensen; Kim Wilsborg	Netherlands; Jeroen Lunsingh; Marc van de Kuilen; Luuk Veltink; Edwin Vermetten

=== Sitting volleyball ===
Event	Gold	Silver	Bronze
Mixed team	Georgia; David Dardzuli; Enver Giglemiani; Besarion Gudushauri; Giorgi Jabakhidze; Paata Jibuti; Levan Mikava; Mirian Mirianashvili; Manuchar Nakishashvili; Murtaz Osepaishvili; Kakhaberi Zirakashvili	United Kingdom; Daniel Bingley; Kushal Limbu; Scott McNeice; Michael Mellon; Pa Modou Njie; Netra Rana; James Rose; Daniel Shanahan; Aveuta Tuila; Paul Twitchell; Alan White; Darren Young	Estonia; Egerd Erreline; Rene Hinrikus; Margus Hoop; Ott Jõesaar; Tarmo Lepik; Ergo Mets; Marek Piirimägi; Madis Põri; Ivan Smirnov; Agor Tettermann

=== Swimming ===
Men

Event	Class	Gold	Silver	Bronze
50 m freestyle	ISA	Massimo Sapio; Italy	Mark Ormrod; United Kingdom	not awarded
100 m freestyle	ISA	Mark Ormrod; United Kingdom	Garry Robinson; Australia	not awarded
50 m backstroke	ISA	Massimo Sapio; Italy	not awarded	not awarded
50 m breaststroke	ISA	Mark Ormrod; United Kingdom	not awarded	not awarded
50 m freestyle	ISB	Armando Marco Iannuzzi; Italy	John Elliott Ayo; United States	Antonio Auricchio; Italy
100 m freestyle	ISB	Armando Marco Iannuzzi; Italy	John Elliott Ayo; United States	Antonio Auricchio; Italy
50 m backstroke	ISB	Armando Marco Iannuzzi; Italy	Shay Hampton; United States	Raffaele Vicente Di Luca; Italy
50 m breaststroke	ISB	Shay Hampton; United States	Ronald van Dort; Netherlands	Armando Marco Iannuzzi; Italy
50 m freestyle	ISC	Michael Goody; United Kingdom	Andrew Wilkinson; Australia	Dorian Gardner; United States
100 m freestyle	ISC	Andrew Wilkinson; Australia	Michael Goody; United Kingdom	Alex Dewar; United Kingdom
50 m backstroke	ISC	Michael Goody; United Kingdom	Andrew Wilkinson; Australia	Alex Dewar; United Kingdom
50 m breaststroke	ISC	Andrew Wilkinson; Australia	Alex Dewar; United Kingdom	Michael Goody; United Kingdom
50 m freestyle	ISD	Tom Foster; Australia	Bogdan Oksentiuk; Ukraine	Volodymyr Korol; Ukraine
100 m freestyle	ISD	Tom Foster; Australia	Volodymyr Korol; Ukraine	Bogdan Oksentiuk; Ukraine
50 m backstroke	ISD	Tom Foster; Australia	Volodymyr Korol; Ukraine	Richard Gamble; United Kingdom
50 m breaststroke	ISD	Tom Foster; Australia	Viktor Shynkaruk; Ukraine	Luke Hill; Australia

Women

Event	Class	Gold	Silver	Bronze
50 m freestyle	ISB	Raina Marie Hockenberry; United States	not awarded	not awarded
100 m freestyle	ISB	Hannah Marguerite Stolberg; United States	not awarded	not awarded
50 m backstroke	ISB	Hannah Marguerite Stolberg; United States	not awarded	not awarded
50 m breaststroke	ISB	Hannah Marguerite Stolberg; United States	not awarded	not awarded
50 m freestyle	ISC	Sonya Newman; Australia	Rachel Williamson; United Kingdom	Kristen Elizabeth Morris; United States
100 m freestyle	ISC	Sonya Newman; Australia	Kristen Elizabeth Morris; United States	Rachel Williamson; United Kingdom
50 m backstroke	ISC	Sonya Newman; Australia	Rachel Williamson; United Kingdom	Danielle Nichole Pothoof; United States
50 m breaststroke	ISC	Sonya Newman; Australia	Rachel Williamson; United Kingdom	Kristen Elizabeth Morris; United States
50 m freestyle	ISD	Taryn Barbara; Australia	Kira Lavine; United States	Ruth Hunt; Australia
100 m freestyle	ISD	Kira Lavine; United States	Taryn Barbara; Australia	Ruth Hunt; Australia
50 m backstroke	ISD	Ruth Hunt; Australia	Linn Aubrey Dillard; United States	Kira Lavine; United States
50 m breaststroke	ISD	Ruth Hunt; Australia	Stephanie Verhoef; Netherlands	Kira Lavine; United States
4 × 50 m freestyle relay		United States; Linn Aubrey Dillard; Kira Lavine; Kristen Elizabeth Morris; Danielle Nichole Pothoof	Unconquered; Taryn Barbara; Raina Marie Hockenberry; Ruth Hunt; Sonya Newman	not awarded

Mixed

Event	Gold	Silver	Bronze
4 × 50 m freestyle relay	Australia; Tom Foster; Dean Knobel; Nathan Whittington; Andrew Wilkinson	United Kingdom; Alex Dewar; Richard Gamble; Michael Goody; David Watts	United States; Steven Bortle; Dorian Gardner; Alexis Eugene Padilla; Michael Anthony Sousadocarma

=== Wheelchair basketball ===
Event	Gold	Silver	Bronze
Mixed team	United States; Ross Alewine; Josue Paul Barron; Brian Canich; Chance Field; Matthew Grashen; Stephanie Johnson; Alex Michael Nguyen; Chris Parks; Ryan Pinney; Joshua David Smith; George Edward Vera; Brian Anthony Williams	Netherlands; Jacco Dudink; Jeroen Lunsingh; Marc van de Kuilen; Jelle van der Steen; Ronald van Dort; Edwin Vermetten; Jeffrey Vroegop; Alina Zoet	United Kingdom; Daniel Bingley; Paul Guest; Ryan Hewitt; Lee Matthews; Michael Mellon; Richard Pullen; James Rose

=== Wheelchair rugby ===
Event	Gold	Silver	Bronze
Mixed team	Australia; Pete Arbuckle; Matt Blunt; Davin Bretherton; Matthew Brumby; Dave Connolly; Mark Daniels; Braedon Griffiths; Trudi Lines; Pete Rudland; Jamie Tanner; Jeff Wright	United Kingdom; Daniel Bingley; Peter Dunning; Michael Matthews; Scott McNeice; Michael Mellon; Jeff Robinson; Clive Smith; Martin Tye	United States; Josue Paul Barron; Jay Collins; Brant Ireland; Sebastiana Lopez; Ryan Major; Alex Michael Nguyen; Joel Rodriguez; Joshua David Smith; Sua Tui; Brian Anthony Williams

== Media and broadcast ==
ABC was the broadcast partner for the fourth Invictus Games with extensive broadcasting relating to the Invictus Games broadcast across the network on free-to-air, video on demand (iVIEW), YouTube live streaming, radio, podcasts and online. APN Outdoor was the official outdoor media partner, and Facebook the social media partner.
