= Off Kilter (song) =

Single by Birds of Tokyo

from the album Day One
- A-side: "Off Kilter"
- Released: December 2005
- Recorded: July 2005
- Genre: Alternative rock
- Length: 2:33
- Label: Egg Records/MGM Distribution
- Songwriters: Adam Spark, Ian Kenny, Anthonny Jackson, Adam Weston
- Producer: Forrester Savell

Birds of Tokyo singles chronology
"One Way" / "Stay" (2005)	"Off Kilter" (2005)	"Black Sheets" (2007)

Audio video
- "Off Kilter" on YouTube

"Off Kilter" is the first song released from Birds of Tokyo's debut album Day One. It was released December 2005 on independent label, Egg Records, through MGM Distribution. It was produced by Forrester Savell (Helmet, Full Scale, Karnivool, Gavin Rossdale). The single received national radio airplay through Triple J and community radio stations, resulting in the initial production of the band's debut album, Day One, selling out nationwide. The album was released on 3 February 2007 and debuted at No. 88 on the ARIA album charts and No. 3 on the AIR album charts.

Sputnik Music describes "Off Kilter" as "efficiently squeezes a hell of a lot into its meager 2:33 duration. Building up brilliantly as it progresses, excellent dynamics and structure are combined with an amazing pop sensibility to provide the album highlight." In an interview with 3rd Degree the band's guitarist, Adam Spark, considers "Off Kilter" to be the best of the band's three singles released so far. "These songs came from a very real, very raw place, I think the reason it’s resonating with other people is because there was no bullshit thrown into the songs. They’re as real and honest as the way we felt at the time"

== Track listing ==
1. "Off Kilter" - 2:33
