= Birds of Tokyo (album) =

Studio album by Birds of Tokyo
- Released: 23 July 2010
- Recorded: 2010
- Genre: Alternative rock
- Length: 44:23
- Label: EMI
- Producer: Scott Horscroft and Adam Spark

Birds of Tokyo chronology
The Broken Strings Tour (2010)	Birds of Tokyo (2010)	This Fire (EP) (2012)

Singles from Birds of Tokyo
- 1. "The Saddest Thing I Know" Released: 23 April 2010; 2. "Plans" Released: 9 July 2010; 3. "Wild at Heart" Released: 17 December 2010; 4. "Circles" Released: 11 March 2011

Professional ratings
Review scores
Source	Rating
AllMusic	4/5 stars

Birds of Tokyo is the third album by Australian alternative rock band Birds of Tokyo, released on 23 July 2010 through EMI Records. It was recorded in Sydney, Australia; New York City; London; and Gothenburg, Sweden, produced by Scott Horscroft, co-produced by Adam Spark and mixed by Michael Brauer. This is the last album to feature Anthony Jackson on bass guitar before his departure in March 2011. At the J Awards of 2010, the album was nominated for Australian Album of the Year.

The album won the ARIA Award for Best Rock Album in 2010.

== History ==
In early 2010 the band returned to the studio to commence work on their third album. March 2010 saw the release of "The Saddest Thing I Know" and the announcement of an Australian tour by the same name, supported by New Zealand-based band Midnight Youth. The second single "Plans" was premiered on Richard Kingsmill's '2010' show on Triple j Radio on Sunday 20 June.

== Track listing ==
=== CD ===
No.	Title	Length
1.	"Plans"	3:38
2.	"The Saddest Thing I Know"	3:08
3.	"The Dark Side of Love"	3:42
4.	"In the Veins of Death Valley"	4:10
5.	"Circles"	4:20
6.	"Wild at Heart"	4:01
7.	"The Gap"	3:47
8.	"Murmurs"	4:21
9.	"The Unspeakable Scene"	3:20
10.	"Waiting for the Wolves"	2:58
11.	"If This Ship Sinks (I Give In)"	6:58

=== DVD ===
- "The Saddest Thing I Know" promotional video clip – 3:14
- "The Saddest Thing I Know" (3D version) promotional video clip – 3:14
- The Making of "The Saddest Thing I Know" – 2:55
- The Making of "The Saddest Thing I Know" (3D version) – 3:11
- "Plans" promotional video clip – 3:37
- The Making of "Plans" – 6:17
- Studio 301 Live Session ("The Saddest Thing I Know", "Murmurs", "Wild at Heart", "Circles", "In the Veins of Death Valley" and "Wayside") – 28:49
- Making of the Album Studio Footage – 11:02
- Interview with Scott Horscroft and Adam Spark – 14:15
- Photo montage (52 photos) – 2:53

== Personnel ==
- Ian Kenny – vocals
- Adam Spark – guitars, vocals, keyboards
- Adam Weston – drums, percussion
- Anthony Jackson – bass

Additional musicians

- Glenn Sarangapany – keyboards, synthesizers

=== Production ===
- All songs written by Birds of Tokyo
- Producer – Scott Horscroft
- Co-producer – Adam Spark
- Engineer (assistant) – Jean-Paul Fung
- Mixer – Michael Brauer
- Mastering – Bob Ludwig
- Recorded at Big Jesus Burger Studios
- Recorded at Svenska Grammofonstudion
- Recorded at Air Studios
- Mixed at Electric Lady Studios
- Mastered by Gateway Mastering

== Charts ==
=== Weekly charts ===
Chart (2010)	Position
Australian Albums (ARIA)	2

=== Year-end charts ===
Chart (2010)	Position
Australian Albums (ARIA)	24
Chart (2011)	Position
Australian Albums (ARIA)	56

== Certifications ==
Region	Certification	Certified units/sales
Australia (ARIA)	2× Platinum	140,000^{‡}
^{‡} Sales+streaming figures based on certification alone.
