= Plans (Birds of Tokyo song) =

Single by Birds of Tokyo

from the album Birds of Tokyo
- Released: 9 July 2010
- Recorded: 2010
- Genre: Alternative rock
- Length: 3:37
- Label: EMI
- Songwriters: Anthony Jackson, Ian Kenny, Adam Spark, Adam Weston
- Producers: Scott Horscroft, Adam Spark

Birds of Tokyo singles chronology
"The Saddest Thing I Know" (2010)	"Plans" (2010)	"Wild at Heart" (2010)

Music video
- "Plans" on YouTube

"Plans" is the second single by Australian alternative rock band Birds of Tokyo's self-titled third album, Birds of Tokyo. The song proved to be their most successful single to date, peaking at #11 on the Australian Singles Chart and becoming their first ever single to hit the top 50 in Australia. "Plans" was performed by the group at the 2010 ARIA Awards, in which the song was nominated for "Single of the Year". It was voted No. 4 in Triple J's Hottest 100 countdown of 2010. As of September 2012, "Plans" has been certified triple platinum by ARIA with sales exceeding 210,000.

== Background ==
In an interview with Triple J, frontman Ian Kenny said regarding the song:

When you're writing records, every now and then you come across a bit of a stone in the road in the writing process, and you start questioning things. "Plans" just wasn't coming together the way we thought it should, so we put the song down for a bit, and when we returned to it – I don't remember what we did differently – it came together. We got the demo and went, "Yep, that's got something in its guts."

== Chart performance ==
"Plans" debuted on the ARIA Singles Chart at No. 30 on the issue dated 18 July 2010, however it descended to No. 32 on its second week. It eventually reached its peak of No. 11 six weeks later. As of 23 January 2011, "Plans" has spent a total of 28 weeks in the ARIA top 50. The song debuted on the New Zealand Singles Chart at No. 38 on 29 November 2010 and reached the peak position of No. 34.

== Music video ==
The music video for "Plans" premiered on 21 June 2010. It was shot in Brisbane, Australia and directed by Sean Gilligan.

== Track listing ==
Digital download

1. "Plans" – 3:37

Digital EP

1. "Plans" – 3:37
2. "The Saddest Thing I Know" (The Rock Acoustic Sessions) – 3:07
3. "Wild at Heart" (The Rock Acoustic Sessions) – 3:58
4. "Plans" (music video) – 3:36

== Charts ==
=== Weekly charts ===
Chart (2010)	Peak Position
ARIA Singles Chart	11
New Zealand Singles Chart	34

=== Year-end charts ===
Chart (2010)	Position
ARIA Singles Chart	47

== Certifications ==
Region	Certification	Certified units/sales
Australia (ARIA)	8× Platinum	560,000^{‡}
New Zealand (RMNZ)	Platinum	30,000^{‡}
^{‡} Sales+streaming figures based on certification alone.

== Release history ==
Country	Date	Format
Australia	9 July 2010	Digital download
