= Lanterns (song) =

Single by Birds of Tokyo

from the album March Fires
- Released: 14 January 2013
- Recorded: 2012
- Genre: Alternative rock
- Length: 3:56
- Label: EMI
- Songwriters: Ian Berney, Ian Kenny, Glenn Sarangapany, Adam Spark, Adam Weston
- Producer: Dave Cooley

Birds of Tokyo singles chronology
"This Fire" (2012)	"Lanterns" (2013)	"When the Night Falls Quiet" (2013)

Music video
- "Lanterns" on YouTube

"Lanterns" is the second single from Australian alternative rock band Birds of Tokyo's fourth album, March Fires. Band member Ian Berney said "It was always about our own sense of community and reaching far and wide in the most positive way we could, with the most positive message we had at the time, and it really connected with people."

== Music video ==
The music video for "Lanterns" was directed by Josh Logue and was shot in Sydney, Australia. It was nominated for Best Video at the ARIA Music Awards of 2013.

== Chart performance ==
"Lanterns" debuted at number five on the ARIA Singles Chart on the issue dated 28 January 2013 It was the band's first ever single to hit the top 10 in Australia. "Lanterns" reached its peak of number three two weeks later. It also topped the ARIA Australian Singles Chart for a total of nine weeks.

"Lanterns" also became the band's first song to cross over to the United States, garnering airplay on modern rock stations and having its highest peak at #11 on Billboard's Adult Alternative Airplay chart.

== Charts ==
=== Weekly charts ===
Chart (2013–14)	Peak position
Australia (ARIA)	3
Slovakia (Rádio Top 100)	64
US Rock & Alternative Airplay (Billboard)	36
US Adult Alternative Airplay (Billboard)	11
US Alternative Airplay (Billboard)	32

=== Year-end charts ===
Chart (2013)	Position
Australia (ARIA)	25
Chart (2014)	Position
US Adult Alternative Songs (Billboard)	50

== Certifications ==
Region	Certification	Certified units/sales
Australia (ARIA)	8× Platinum	560,000^{‡}
New Zealand (RMNZ)	Gold	15,000^{‡}
^{‡} Sales+streaming figures based on certification alone.

== Release history ==
Country	Date	Format	Label
Australia	14 January 2013	Digital download	EMI
United States	20 January 2014	Adult album alternative radio	Loma Vista Recordings, Republic Records
United States	18 March 2014	Modern rock radio	Loma Vista Recordings, Republic Records
United States	22 April 2014	Contemporary hit radio	Loma Vista Recordings, Republic Records
