= Shkmeruli =

Traditional Georgian chicken dish

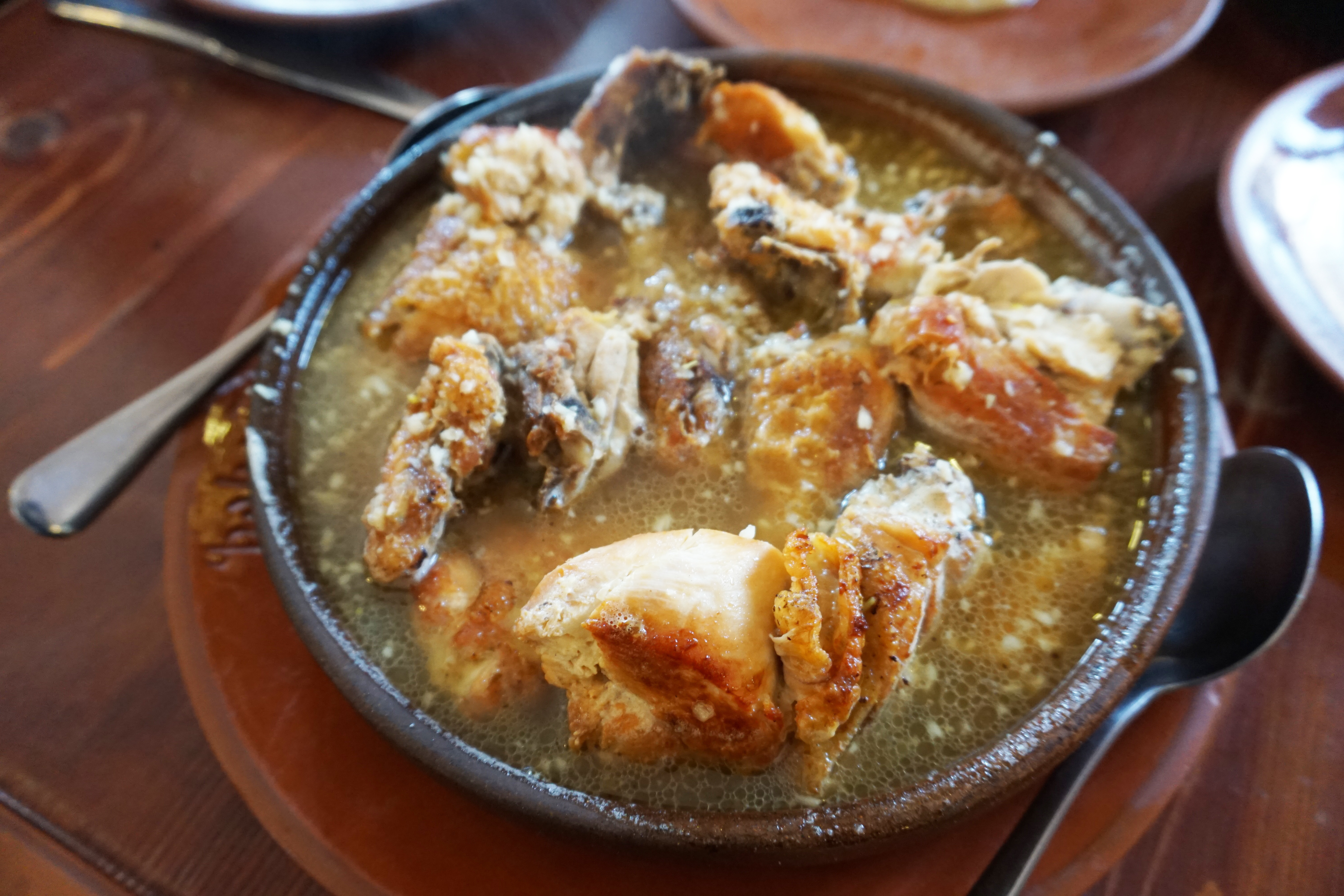
- Shkmeruli in a traditional Georgian clay dishwear Ketsi
- Course: Main
- Place of origin: Georgia
- Region or state: Shkmeri, Racha
- Main ingredients: Chicken, garlic

Shkmeruli (Note: Also referred as Chkmeruli.) (Georgian: შქმერული, romanized: shkmeruli) is a traditional Georgian dish of fried chicken cooked in garlic sauce.

== History ==
Historically, throughout various regions of Georgia, dishes featuring chicken and garlic sauce have long been prepared—typically cooked by stewing in an earthenware pot or by roasting. Subsequently, milk began to be incorporated into this dish, and the recipe eventually made its way to Shkmeri, a village located in the Oni district of the Racha region. The name "Shkmeruli" is derived from this very village of Shkmeri. Shkmeruli is cooked over low heat in garlic sauce for 20–25 minutes. Shkmeruli is paired with bread. It can be also mixed in with utskho suneli, svan salt and ajika.

=== Shkmeruli in Japan ===
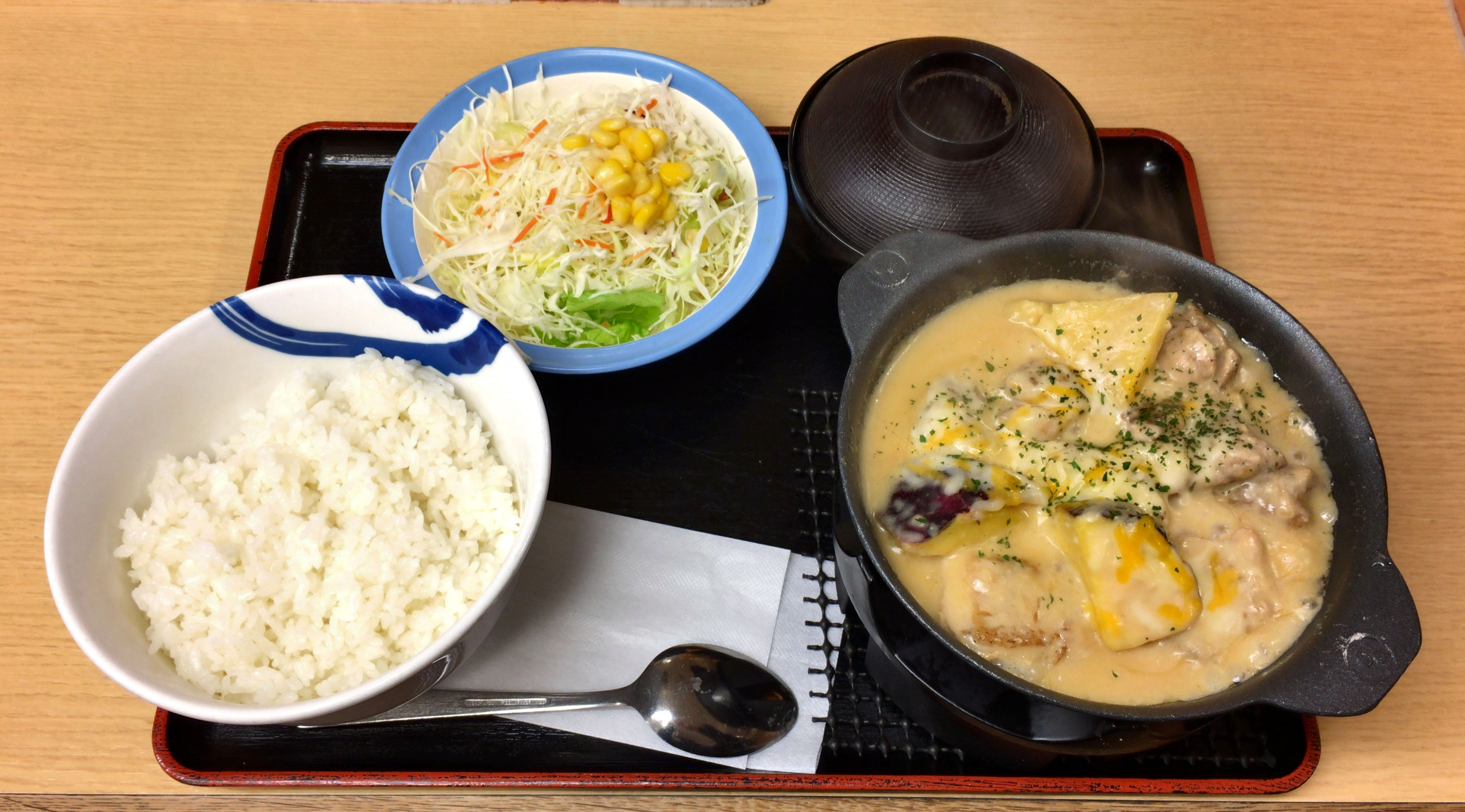
Japanese set of Shkmeruli.

In 2019, Matsuya Foods chain of restaurants conducted a limited-trial launch of its "Shkmeruli Hot Pot Meal" at select locations. It generated significant attention, particularly on Twitter, that boosted the recognition of a dish throughout Japan. At Matsuya, sweet potatoes were added as an ingredient and served alongside the rice. Georgian ambassador to Japan, Teimuraz Lezhava, played a significant role in its popularization and was the catalyst for the ensuing buzz and positive feedback in his interviews, noting that the dish paired well with rice. In 2020, Imedi TV, aired news lasting just under seven minutes that focused on Shkmeruli, its expansion into Japan, and its reception within the country. This segment covered both the traditional preparation methods practiced in the village of Shkmeri and the manner in which the dish is served at Matsuya.

== See also ==
- Satsivi
- Chakhokhbili
