= Utskho suneli =

Georgian spice mix

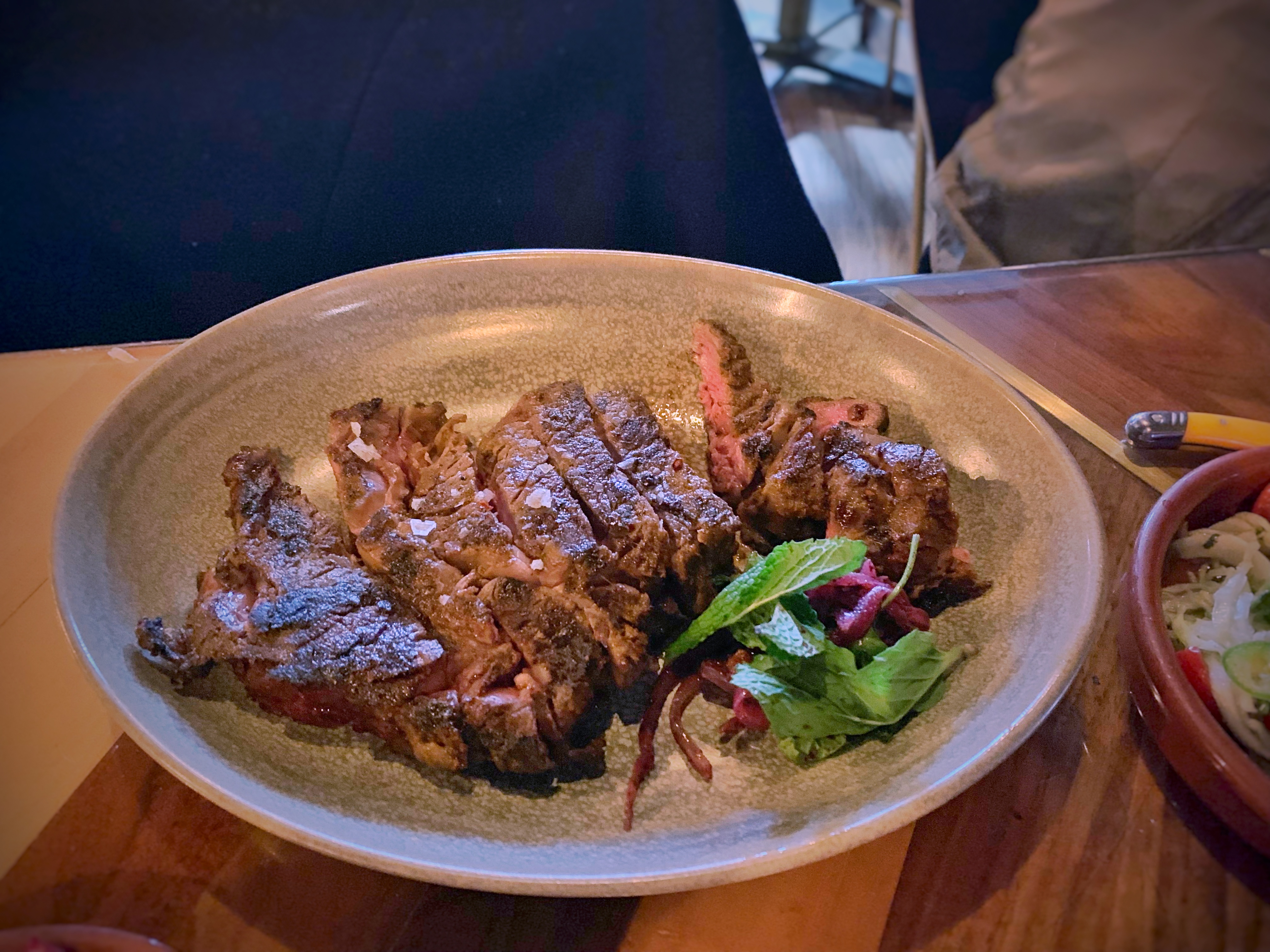
- Rib eye steak with utskho suneli and ajika
- Similar dishes: served with badrijani, kubdari, satsivi, bazhe, kharcho, khmeli suneli

Utskho suneli (Georgian: უცხო სუნელი, lit. 'foreign spice') (Note: It may also be translated as a "strange and fragrant smell from far away".) is a traditional Georgian spice mix with blue fenugreek. It is thought that utskho suneli have integrated the culinary tradition from the influence of the late medieval Persia or Mughal India. It is used separately and also in mix with the svanuri marili salt and khmeli suneli. The herb is one of the most important parts of the Georgian cooking traditions, and is present in almost every dish.

== See also ==
- Kharcho
