= Ojakhuri =

Georgian meat and potato dish

- Place of origin: Georgia
- Serving temperature: hot
- Main ingredients: beef, pork, potato

Ojakhuri (Georgian: ოჯახური, romanized: ojakhuri) is a traditional Georgian dish, consisting of fried meat and potatoes. It is prepared using various types of meat (beef, pork, or even chicken), potatoes, and spices, and is traditionally served on a ketsi clay plates.

== History ==
In Georgian, ojakhuri means "family-style"; this dish is typically prepared for the entire family. Consequently, a large quantity of a dish is usually cooked to ensure there is enough for everyone. According to a tradition, Ojakhuri came into existence due to a meat shortage in a Georgian family. The housewife, wishing to feed every family member, replaced a portion of the precious meat with an equal amount of potatoes and seasoned the dish with spices. The children loved this new combination, and over time, the recipe spread throughout every region of Georgia, becoming a beloved family dish. In various regions of Georgia, different types of ojakhuri is prepared. The foundation of the dish consists of meat and potatoes, cut into large chunks and fried until golden brown. Additional ingredients often include onions, tomatoes, bell peppers, and garlic, as well as traditional Georgian spices: khmeli suneli, ground coriander, ajika, black pepper, and red pepper. When served, the dish is typically garnished with fresh herbs, primarily cilantro or parsley.

== See also ==
- Tkemali
