= Into the Surf =

Single by Foals

from the album Everything Not Saved Will Be Lost – Part 2
- Released: 25 September 2019
- Recorded: 2018
- Studio: 123 (London)
- Genre: Dream pop
- Length: 4:31
- Label: Transgressive; Warner
- Songwriter(s): Jack Bevan; Edwin Congreave; Yannis Philippakis; Jimmy Smith
- Producer(s): Brett Shaw

Foals singles chronology
"The Runner" (2019)	"Into the Surf" (2019)	"Like Lightning" (2019)

"Into the Surf" is the third single by British indie rock band, Foals, from their sixth studio album, Everything Not Saved Will Be Lost – Part 2. The single premiered on 25 September 2019 via Zane Lowe's Beats 1 radio show while the animated music video premiered a few weeks later on 7 October 2019.

== Critical reception ==
Amanda Thilo, writing for Soundigest, praised the track, saying "'Into The Surf' is an expansive sonic landscape while stripping away most electronic elements and heavy-hitting instrumentals. Shimmering effects create an airy environment".

She also commends the track's complete tonal antitheses to the band's previous hard-hitting singles, Black Bull and The Runner, "where the band plays with aggression and uncontained energy. Here, the energy is just as powerful, channeled into creating an entirely different mood. Listening to the tracks right after each other creates quite an emotional rollercoaster."

== Lyrics ==
Lead singer Yannis Philippakis describes "Into the Surf" as "this shadow of death, of someone not returning from a voyage." He adds, tying in a connection to his Greek heritage, "There's a type of Greek folk song that's always to do with the immigration of Greek people and how dying on foreign shores is always viewed as the worst fate – to die far away from your home and your family."

== Music video ==
Released 7 October 2019, the video directed by Steve Warne features an abstract narrative told through stop-motion animation that loosely mirrors the lyrics of the song.

The clip focuses on two characters during a gloomy night: a male figure literally swimming through the sky and a woman, his presumed loved one, waiting wistfully by an attic window and sending a single jasmine flower into a streaming, aerial current of jasmines that flow toward an illuminated moon. The setting for the video was inspired by the Greek island of Amorgos.

== Track listing ==
No.	Title	Length
1.	"Into the Surf"	4:31
2.	"The Runner"	4:21
3.	"Black Bull"	3:07
