= The Runner (song) =

Single by Foals

from the album Everything Not Saved Will Be Lost – Part 2
- Released: 5 September 2019
- Recorded: 2018
- Studio: 123 (London)
- Genre: Indie rock; alternative rock
- Length: 4:21
- Label: Transgressive; Warner
- Songwriter(s): Jack Bevan; Edwin Congreave; Yannis Philippakis; Jimmy Smith
- Producer(s): Brett Shaw

Foals singles chronology
"Black Bull" (2019)	"The Runner" (2019)	"Into the Surf" (2019)

Audio sample
- file; help

Music video
- "The Runner" on YouTube

"The Runner" is the second single by British rock band Foals, off their sixth studio album, Everything Not Saved Will Be Lost – Part 2. The single premiered on 5 September 2019 via Annie Mac's BBC Radio 1 show, and a 9:29 version, remixed by Australia's RÜFÜS DU SOL, was released on 27 November 2019.

== Critical reception ==
Lisa Wright, writing for DIY praised the track for its musical aesthetic, "Swaggering straight in with guitars that prowl" and notes "Though there's a cockiness to the verses, there's something more fallible, more grandiose that sweeps in as the chorus arrives."

Comparing the track's cohesion to the band's previous single, "Black Bull", Wright continues saying "If the monstrous riffs of 'Black Bull', came good on the band's promise to deliver a heavier, dirtier follow up to its predecessor, then with 'The Runner' the message is well and truly cemented: Foals aren't fucking about."

Mark Beaumont, writing for The Guardian describes the track as "A wasteland ruled over by a funky android Royal Blood." Beaumont continues with a peculiar comparison saying "Relentless orders to 'keep on running' suggest less Mad Max Beyond Thunderdome, more Paula Radcliffe beyond lavatory, but it's Foals, it's massive."

== Lyrics ==
Philippakis describes "The Runner" as lyrically set in the aftermath of what's described in the last songs on Everything Not Saved Will Be Lost – Part 1. "It's a call to find a sense of purpose and perseverance despite the odds and despite the troubles we may find inside or outside ourselves."

== Music video ==
Released 30 September 2019, the video directed by Quentin Deronzier, is centered around lead singer, Yannis Philippakis being pursued by a doppelgänger (played by Vincent Heneine) on a surreal, disorienting odyssey through a set of natural environments, symbolic of the five natural elements.

Initially, beginning in a void (aether) of A.R, Yannis and his double get into a series of physical altercations throughout the narrative, which progresses the journey during his attempts at escaping. From the void transforming into a wading pool leading out to the Ocean (water) to an open meadow (earth) and a literal collapsing sky (air) via an art gallery of paintings that act as portals to their displayed subject.

Eventually ending up back in the void where an illuminated painting of a forest is showcased, instead of retreating, Yannis fully confronts his other half after a brief parley over a bottle of whiskey. Using the bottle to set the painting on fire (by way of smashing the display lights), the two continue their conflict into the now fully engulfed canvas. With no doppelgänger in sight, Yannis comes out the other side alone walking through the burning woods till reaching a hillside to truly see the full scope. With the entire forest devastated by flames, he's only left to observe the massive inferno and destruction created by his actions, as he ultimately was fighting with himself the whole time.

== Track listing ==
No.	Title	Length
1.	"The Runner"	4:21
2.	"Black Bull"	3:07

== Charts ==
Chart (2019–2020)	Peak position
Belgium (Ultratip Bubbling Under Flanders)	35
Scotland (OCC)	79
UK Singles (OCC)	87
US Adult Alternative Songs (Billboard)	27
US Alternative Airplay (Billboard)	32

== Certifications ==
Region	Certification	Certified units/sales
United Kingdom (BPI)	Silver	200,000^{‡}
^{‡} Sales+streaming figures based on certification alone.
