= Svan salt =

Georgian spice mix

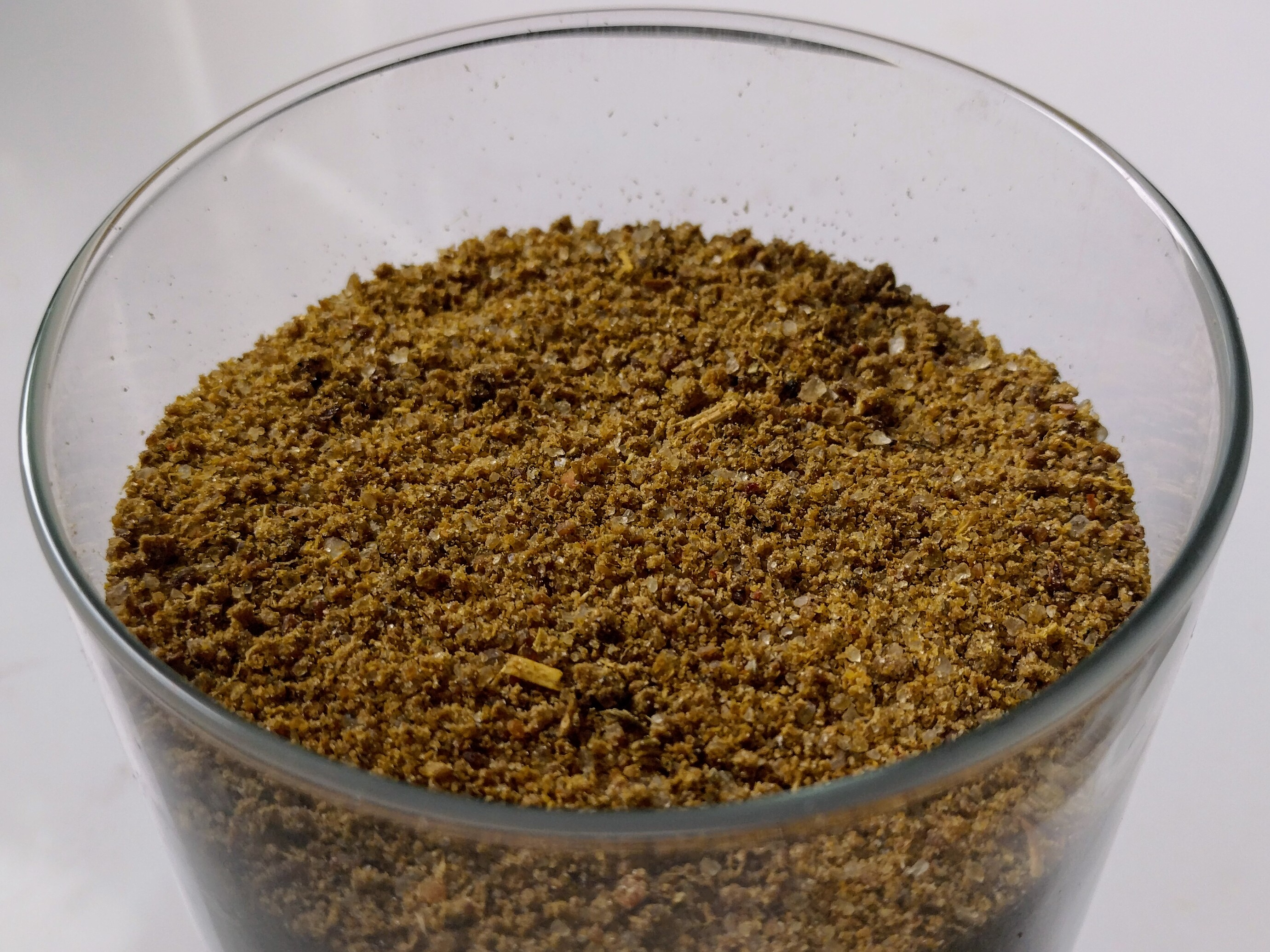
- Region or state: Svaneti, Georgia

Svan salt (Georgian: სვანური მარილი, romanized: svanuri marili) (Note: It may also be referred as Svanetian salt or Svanuri marili, while, in Svan language, it is known as lushnu jim (ლუშნუ ჯიმ).) is a traditional Georgian spice mix from Svaneti, Georgia. It is a versatile seasoning and is often used in the preparation of soups, salads, as well as meat, potato, and fish dishes.

== Herb ==
The spices used to create Svan salt varies, but will usually contain ground coriander, dill, blue fenugreek, red pepper, marigold, garlic, cumin, and white salt. When freshly made, it is usually a bit moist and very aromatic. The wild herbs are gathered in Upper Svaneti, at altitudes ranging from 1,800 to 2,400 meters. According to tradition, this blend contains key ingredients for longevity. Historically, Svaneti suffered from a shortage of salt, so the Svans traveled to various locations to harvest or extract it, particularly along the coast. After bringing it back to Svaneti, various ingredients were mixed in to increase the quantity.

In 2015, Svan salt, along with a number of other Svan culinary and cultural traditions, were placed on the Georgian list of intangible cultural heritage.

== See also ==
- Khmeli suneli
- Utskho suneli
