= Satsivi =

Georgian poultry dish

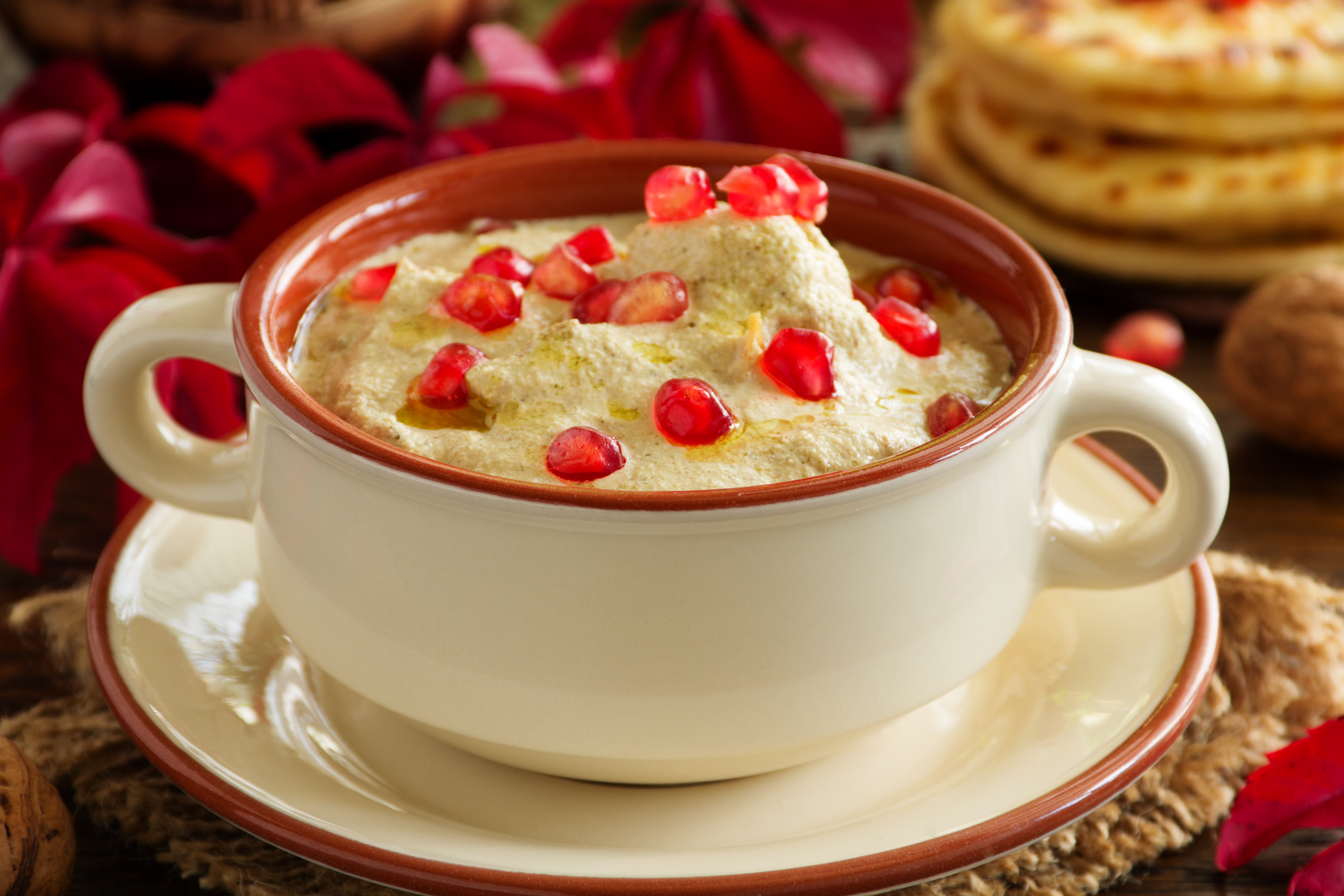
- Chicken satsivi garnished with pomegranate seeds
- Course: Sauce, appetizer
- Place of origin: Georgia
- Main ingredients: Walnuts

Satsivi (Georgian: საცივი, romanized: satsivi, lit. 'cold dish'; also known as chicken in walnut sauce) is a Georgian dish. It is made using poultry (such as chicken or turkey) put into a walnut sauce, typically seasoned with salt, pepper, garlic, fenugreek, coriander and cinnamon. The term satsivi is also used as a generic name for a variety of poultry made with the walnut sauce.

== Description ==
Satstivi is a Georgian dish made with walnut sauce and served cold, either as a dipping sauce for boiled or fried turkey or chicken. Traditionally, satsivi is made of walnuts, water, garlic, a combination of dried herbs (usually Imeretian saffron and fenugreek), vinegar, cayenne pepper, and salt to taste.

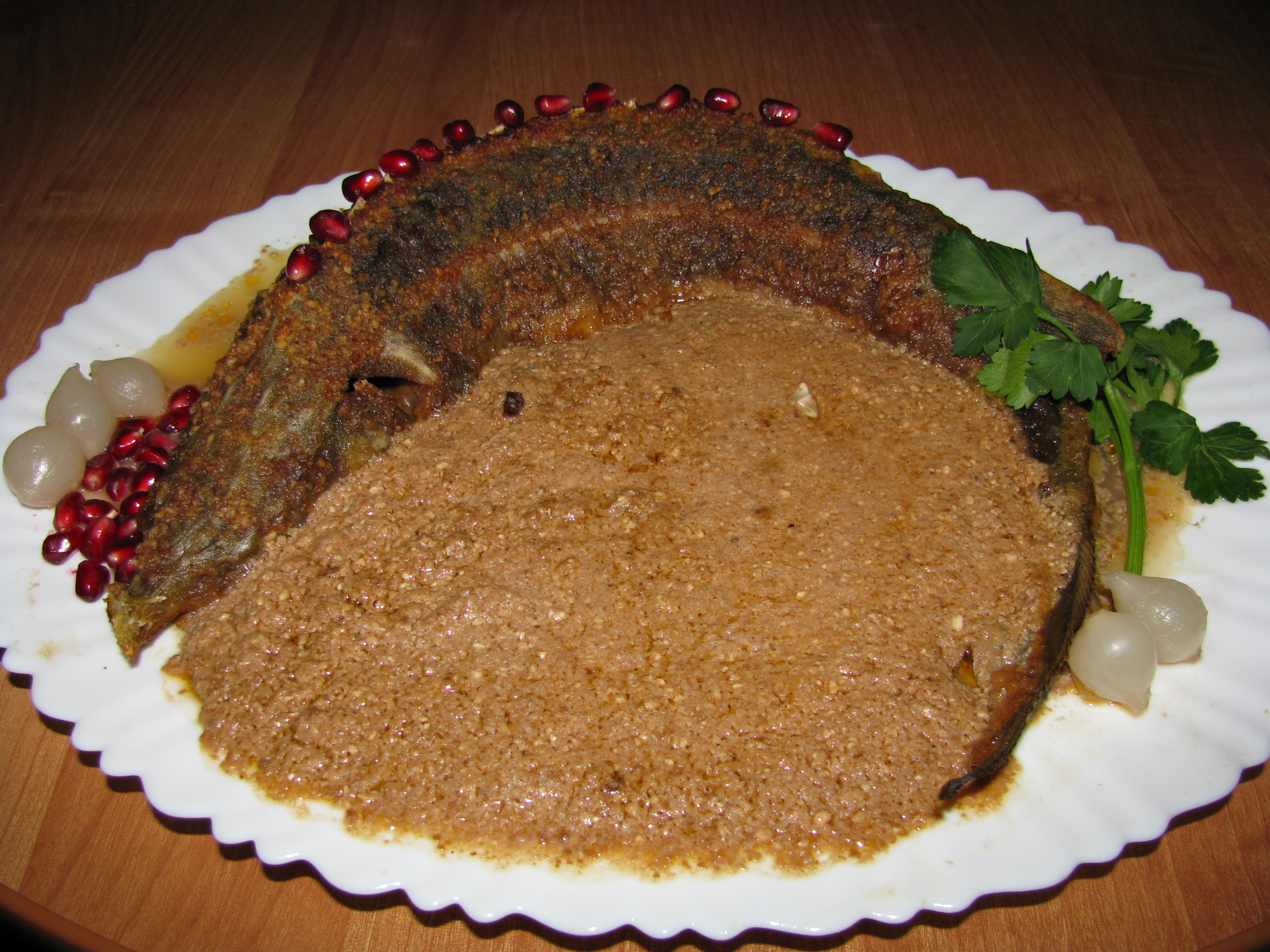
Sterlet with walnut sauce

Boiled turkey or chicken pieces submerged in satsivi is a staple of winter holiday feasts. The dish as a whole is usually also referred to as satsivi. There are also vegetarian varieties of this dish made with eggplants or cauliflower.

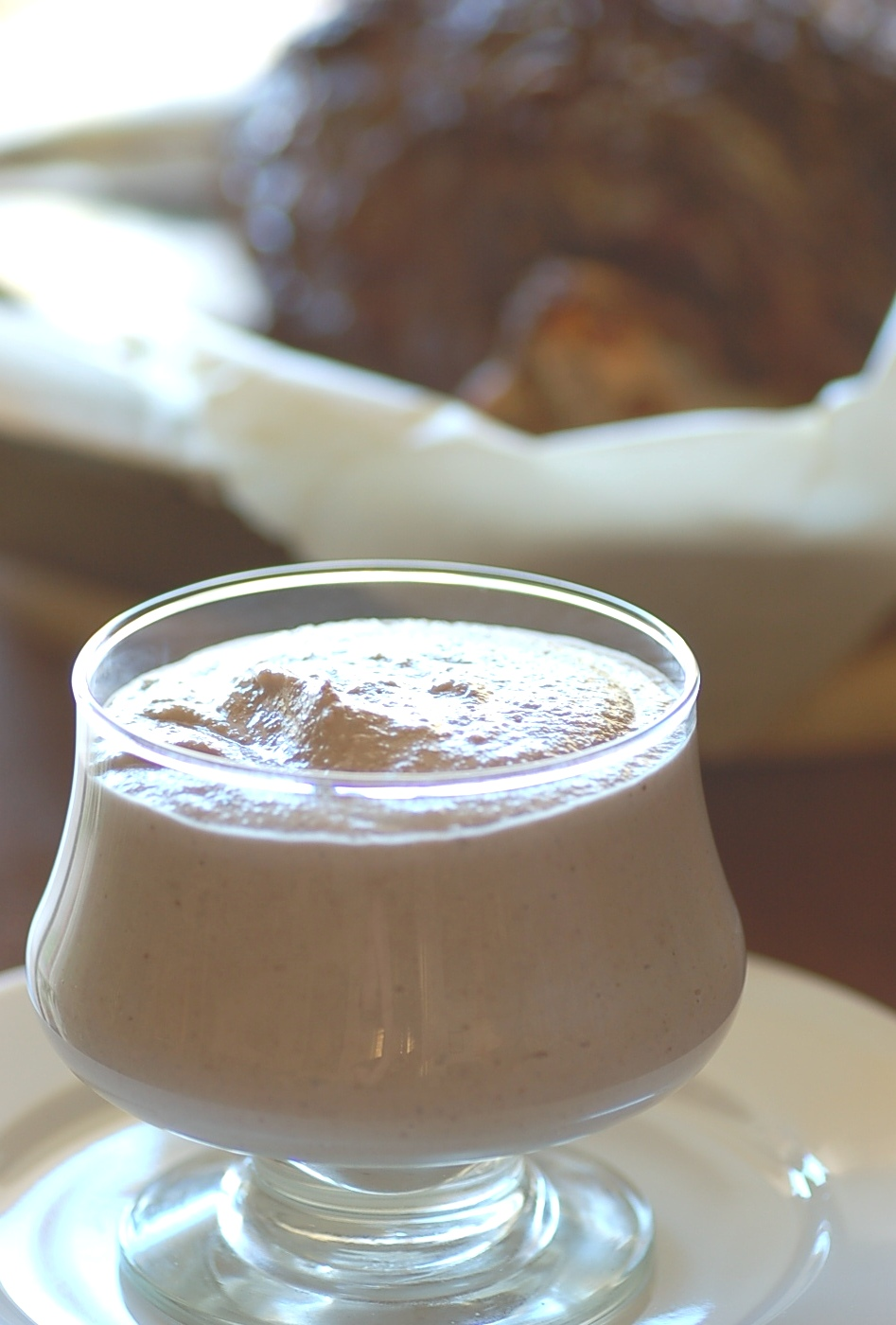
Walnut sauce

A similar dish of boiled chicken with walnut paste is known as Circassian chicken in Turkish, Levantine, and Egyptian cuisine, as well as aquz in the Caspian cuisine of northern Iran.

== See also ==
- Bazhe
- Fesenjān
- Nigvziani badrijani
- List of sauces
