= On the Luna =

Single by English indie rock band Foals

Single by Foals

from the album Everything Not Saved Will Be Lost – Part 1
- Released: 14 February 2019
- Recorded: 2018
- Studio: 123 (London, England)
- Genre: Indie rock; electronic rock
- Length: 3:13
- Label: Transgressive; Warner Bros.
- Songwriter(s): Jack Bevan; Edwin Congreave; Yannis Philippakis; Jimmy Smith
- Producer(s): Yannis Philippakis; Foals; Brett Shaw

Foals singles chronology
"Exits" (2019)	"On the Luna" (2019)	"Sunday" (2019)

"On the Luna" is the second single by British indie rock band Foals from their fifth studio album, Everything Not Saved Will Be Lost – Part 1. The song and music video were released on 14 February 2019.

== Style ==
DIY magazine called "On the Luna" a "slice of vintage" Foals with a mixture of loud/quiet verses. Patrick Clarke of New Musical Express described the song as a "jerky" track. In an interview with New Musical Express, Yannis Philippakis described the direction of the track as not being "yin and yang or anything corny like that. You can also tell that it’s a band working in the same space over the same period. If you were to put it crudely, the first record is probably more keyboard-driven and has slightly more of a new-wave feel to it. Then album two has more of the heavier rock frenetic energy."

Lake Shatz of the Consequence of Sound called the song a mixture of "bright, ’80s-style synths matched up with lively guitar riffs".

== Music video ==
The music video features montages of old footage and the band recording the track at 123 Studios in London. The footage for the video was compiled by Kit Monteith and Alex Knowles. The video was edited by Michael Sherrington at Forest of Black Studios.

== Charts ==
Chart (2019)	Peak position
UK Singles Chart Update (OCC)	100
Belgium (Ultratop 50 Flanders)	90
