= Exits (song) =

2019 single by Foals

Single by Foals

from the album Everything Not Saved Will Be Lost – Part 1
- Released: 21 January 2019
- Recorded: 2018
- Studio: 123 (London, England)
- Genre: Indie rock; pop rock
- Length: 5:57 (album version); 3:50 (radio edit)
- Label: Transgressive; Warner Bros.
- Songwriter(s): Jack Bevan; Edwin Congreave; Yannis Philippakis; Jimmy Smith
- Producer(s): Yannis Philippakis; Foals; Brett Shaw

Foals singles chronology
"Birch Tree" (2015)	"Exits" (2019)	"On the Luna" (2019)

"Exits" is the first single by British indie rock band Foals from their fifth studio album, Everything Not Saved Will Be Lost – Part 1. The song and music video were released on 21 January 2019 in the United Kingdom after its debut on DJ Annie Mac's BBC Radio 1. This is the band's first single not to feature bassist Walter Gervers (after his initial departure from the group during 2018, before eventually rejoining in 2023). A trance remix of the song by British electronic producer, George FitzGerald was released on 7 March 2019.

== Music video ==
The music video, directed by Albert Moya features French actress Christa Théret and Game of Thrones star Isaac H. Wright as students at a clandestine fencing academy in a random series of interconnected vignettes of a surrealist nature. The video was filmed in Budapest.

== Track listing ==
Promo single
No.	Title	Length
1.	"Exits"	5:57
2.	"Exits" (radio edit)	3:50

== Charts ==
Chart (2019)	Peak position
Belgium (Ultratip Bubbling Under Flanders)	36
Belgium (Ultratip Bubbling Under Wallonia)	44
UK Singles (OCC)	70
US Adult Alternative Songs (Billboard)	23
US Alternative Airplay (Billboard)	22
US Rock & Alternative Airplay (Billboard)	35
