= Like Lightning =

Single by Foals

from the album Everything Not Saved Will Be Lost – Part 2
- Released: 22 November 2019
- Recorded: 2018
- Studio: 123 (London)
- Genre: Blues rock
- Length: 3:34
- Label: Transgressive; Warner
- Songwriter(s): Jack Bevan; Edwin Congreave; Yannis Philippakis; Jimmy Smith
- Producer(s): Brett Shaw

Foals singles chronology
"Into the Surf" (2019)	"Like Lightning" (2019)	"Neptune" (2020)

"Like Lightning" is a song by British indie rock band Foals, released on 22 November 2019 as the fourth single from their sixth studio album, Everything Not Saved Will Be Lost – Part 2 (2019).

== Music video ==
The music video for "Like Lightning" was released on 22 November 2019. The storyline was written by Virginie Kypriotis and the video was produced by Rebecca Rice. Un Oeil Sur Tout animated the video. The video features a Sasquatch figure leading a worldwide charge to curb climate change through green initiatives and eco-socialism. The music video premiered on the Music Declares Emergency website to raise awareness about climate change.

== Critical reception ==
Critical reception to the song was mixed. Hannah Jocelyn, writing for Pitchfork, said "'Like Lightning' plays like the kind of utilitarian blues-rock that music directors reach for when The Black Keys aren’t in the licensing budget."
