= Sunday (Foals song) =

Single by English indie rock band Foals

- Remixes cover

Single by Foals

from the album Everything Not Saved Will Be Lost – Part 1
- Released: 25 February 2019
- Recorded: 2018
- Studio: 123 Studios, London, England
- Genre: Psychedelic rock; space rock; dance-punk
- Length: 5:54 (album version); 3:02 (radio edit)
- Label: Transgressive; Warner Bros.
- Songwriter(s): Jack Bevan; Edwin Congreave; Yannis Philippakis; Jimmy Smith
- Producer(s): Yannis Philippakis; Foals; Brett Shaw

Foals singles chronology
"On the Luna" (2019)	"Sunday" (2019)	"In Degrees" (2019)

"Sunday" is the third single by British indie rock band Foals from their fifth studio album, Everything Not Saved Will Be Lost – Part 1. The song was released on 25 February 2019.

A remix EP of the single was released 27 June 2019 with remixes by British electronic producers, Alex Metric and Lake Turner respectively.

== Style ==
Ryan Reed, writing for the Rolling Stone described "Sunday" as two songs in one, with the intro having a slow-paced psychedelic and space rock tempo before breaking out into a dance-punk outro." Reed further described the song as "Philippakis gently crooning about burning cities and youthful optimism over swaying electric guitars and ambient keyboard textures. The arrangement shifts halfway through into a faster, funky section that builds with squelching synths and overlapping vocals." Sam Moore, writing for NME called "Sunday" a "funk-punk" track.

== Lyrics ==
Philippakis described "Sunday" as a song about the overarching concern of climate change and the apparent inaction by world governments. "Lyrically, there are resonances with what's going on in the world at the moment. I just feel like, what's the utility of being a musician these days, if you can't engage with at least some of this stuff? These songs are white flags, or they're SOSs, or they're cries for help... each in a different way."

== Music video ==
The music video was edited and directed by Leif Podhajsky. The music video features a mirage of storm clouds over a desert with translucent images of Yannis Philippakis since the song in the studio. The music video came out on 2 June 2019.

== Track listing ==
Promo single
No.	Title	Length
1.	"Sunday"	5:54
2.	"Sunday" (album edit)	3:02

Remixes
No.	Title	Length
1.	"Sunday" (Lake Turner Remix)	4:52
2.	"Sunday" (Alex Metric Remix)	7:18
