= Everything Not Saved Will Be Lost – Part 2 =

Studio album by Foals
- Released: 18 October 2019
- Recorded: 2018
- Studio: 123 (London)
- Genres: Progressive rock; arena rock
- Length: 40:24
- Labels: Warner; Transgressive
- Producers: Foals; Brett Shaw

Foals chronology
Everything Not Saved Will Be Lost – Part 1 (2019)	Everything Not Saved Will Be Lost – Part 2 (2019)	Life Is Yours (2022)

Singles from Everything Not Saved Will Be Lost – Part 2
- 1. "Black Bull" Released: 1 August 2019; 2. "The Runner" Released: 5 September 2019; 3. "Into the Surf" Released: 25 September 2019; 4. "Like Lightning" Released: 22 November 2019; 5. "Neptune" Released: 6 February 2020

Everything Not Saved Will Be Lost – Part 2 is the sixth studio album by British rock band Foals. It was released on 18 October 2019 through Warner and Transgressive Records. The album is considered the second half of a two-part project, being supplemented by their consecutive fifth studio album Everything Not Saved Will Be Lost – Part 1, released 8 March 2019. The album cover was shot by famed National Geographic photographer, Maggie Steber. The album was preceded by three singles; "Black Bull", "The Runner", and "Into the Surf". The album became the band's first to reach No. 1 on the UK Albums Chart. The album was the last to feature keyboardist Edwin Congreave before his departure from the band in 2021.

== Promotion ==
The album's lead singles, "Black Bull" and "The Runner" were debuted 1 August and 5 September 2019 respectively via Annie Mac's BBC Radio 1 show alongside the former's music video premiere (via YouTube). The album's third single, "Into the Surf" was released 25 September 2019 via Zane Lowe's Beats 1 radio show, with the animated music video premiering a few weeks later on 7 October 2019.

In further promotion of Part 2, the band announced an upcoming tour documentary of the past year, Rip Up the Road, released on 15 November 2019 exclusively via Amazon Prime, alongside news of a special live performance at The House of Vans skatepark in London on the day of the album's release.

== Critical reception ==
Professional ratings
Aggregate scores
Source	Rating
Metacritic	77/100
Review scores
Source	Rating
AllMusic	3.5/5 stars
Clash	9/10
DIY	5/5 stars
Exclaim!	7/10
The Guardian	3/5 stars
The Independent	3/5 stars
The Irish Times	3/5 stars
Mojo	3/5 stars
NME	5/5 stars
The Observer	5/5 stars
Paste	7.0/10
Pitchfork	5.7/10

At Metacritic, which assigns a normalised rating out of 100 to reviews from mainstream critics, the album received an average score of 77, based on 16 reviews, which indicates "generally favorable reviews".

In his review for Q, Dave Everley praised the album, saying it "underlines why its creators have continued to prosper long after so many of their late-'00s contemporaries have been lost to the waves."

James McNair of Mojo gave the album a mixed review, praising "Black Bull", "Into the Surf", and "The Runner" but criticising the album's "brittle" production, writing, "For the first time in their career Foals sound like they are overreaching themselves a little."

=== Year-end rankings ===
Publication	Accolade	Rank	Ref.
Afisha Daily (Russia)	The Best Foreign Albums of 2019	15	

== Track listing ==
All tracks are written by Yannis Philippakis, Jimmy Smith, Jack Bevan, and Edwin Congreave

No.	Title	Length
1.	"Red Desert"	1:12
2.	"The Runner"	4:21
3.	"Wash Off"	4:30
4.	"Black Bull"	3:07
5.	"Like Lightning"	3:34
6.	"Dreaming Of"	3:45
7.	"Ikaria"	0:42
8.	"10,000 Ft."	4:24
9.	"Into the Surf"	4:31
10.	"Neptune"	10:18
Total length:		40:24

== Personnel ==
- Yannis Philippakis – vocals, guitar, bass
- Jimmy Smith – guitar, keyboards
- Jack Bevan – drums
- Edwin Congreave – keyboards, synthesizers, bass

== Charts ==
Weekly chart performance for Everything Not Saved Will Be Lost – Part 2
Chart (2019)	Peak position
Australian Albums (ARIA)	10
Austrian Albums (Ö3 Austria)	34
Belgian Albums (Ultratop Flanders)	56
Belgian Albums (Ultratop Wallonia)	38
Dutch Albums (Album Top 100)	40
French Albums (SNEP)	40
German Albums (Offizielle Top 100)	23
Hungarian Albums (MAHASZ)	6
Irish Albums (IRMA)	15
Japanese Albums (Oricon)	144
Lithuanian Albums (AGATA)	34
New Zealand Albums (RMNZ)	39
Scottish Albums (Official Charts)	1
Spanish Albums (Promusicae)	44
Swiss Albums (Schweizer Hitparade)	21
UK Albums (Official Charts)	1
US Top Album Sales (Billboard)	28

== Certifications ==
Certification for Everything Not Saved Will Be Lost – Part 2
Region	Certification	Certified units/sales
United Kingdom (BPI)	Silver	60,000^{‡}
^{‡} Sales+streaming figures based on certification alone.
