= Black Bull (song) =

Single by English indie rock band Foals

Single by Foals

from the album Everything Not Saved Will Be Lost – Part 2
- Released: 1 August 2019
- Recorded: 2018
- Studio: 123 (London)
- Genre: Hard rock
- Length: 3:07
- Label: Transgressive; Warner
- Songwriters: Jack Bevan; Edwin Congreave; Yannis Philippakis; Jimmy Smith
- Producer: Brett Shaw

Foals singles chronology
"In Degrees" (2019)	"Black Bull" (2019)	"The Runner" (2019)

Music video
- "Black Bull" on YouTube

"Black Bull" is the lead single by British indie rock band, Foals, off their sixth studio album, Everything Not Saved Will Be Lost – Part 2. The single and music video were released on 1 August 2019, with the track peaking at number 9 on the UK Rock & Metal Singles Chart after initially debuting at number 12.

== Style ==
Most contemporary music critics and journalists described the song being a heavier, rock-oriented song. The New Musical Express called "Black Bull" a "gnarly fucker that flexes their rock muscles – but this time it’s to bursting point. With razor-sharp riffs and a paranoid menace throughout, it’s a full-on onslaught so relentless that it feels constantly under threat of collapse". Laura English, writing for Music Feeds called "Black Bull" "a crashing belter of a song that fully showcases the band’s rock muscles".

DIY called "Black Bull" an "absolutely fucking huge track" saying that "the opening guitar licks of ‘Black Bull’ build up into a thrashing rock number that sees frontman Yannis Philippakis undoubtedly straining a few vocal cords as he screams the lyrics over the tumultuous soundtrack. Tackling conflicted masculinity and delusions of grandeur, it’s biting and brilliant, the perfect introduction for ‘Part 2’."

In an interview with NME, frontman Yannis Philippakis described "Black Bull" as well as Everything Not Saved Will Be Lost – Part 2 as "a heavier listen, the guitars are more emphasized and there’s some big riffs on it. It’s a rock record and it definitely carries on the narrative from part one". Reflecting this heavier sound, "Black Bull" would become the first Foals single to break into the UK Rock & Metal Singles Chart.

== Critical reception ==
Andrew Trendall, writing for the New Musical Express praised the track, giving it 5 stars out of five, calling "Black Bull" "by far, the most violent, urgent thing they have ever recorded." Trendall further said, "if lead single ‘Black Bull’ is anything to by, ‘Part 2’ is very much going to be Jekyll to the Hyde of ‘Part 1’. If ‘Part 1’ was Foals hanging up a chandelier, then ‘Black Bull’ sends it crashing to the ground. After ‘Part 1’ ended with apocalyptic scenes of fire and scorched earth, this is the survivors looking over the wasteland and shouting, “Fuck this”.

== Music video ==
Released 1 August 2019, the music video directed by Niall O'Brien, features clips of the band performing within a dimly-lit room intercut with dramatic, slow-motion footage of a live bull thrashing about within an empty void before charging through and destroying a "Día de muertos" display (a giant wall of Mexican marigolds and shrine to Our Lady of Guadalupe) during the video's climax .

== Track listing ==
No.	Title	Length
1.	"Black Bull"	3:07

== Charts ==
Chart (2019)	Peak position
UK Rock & Metal (Official Charts)	9
