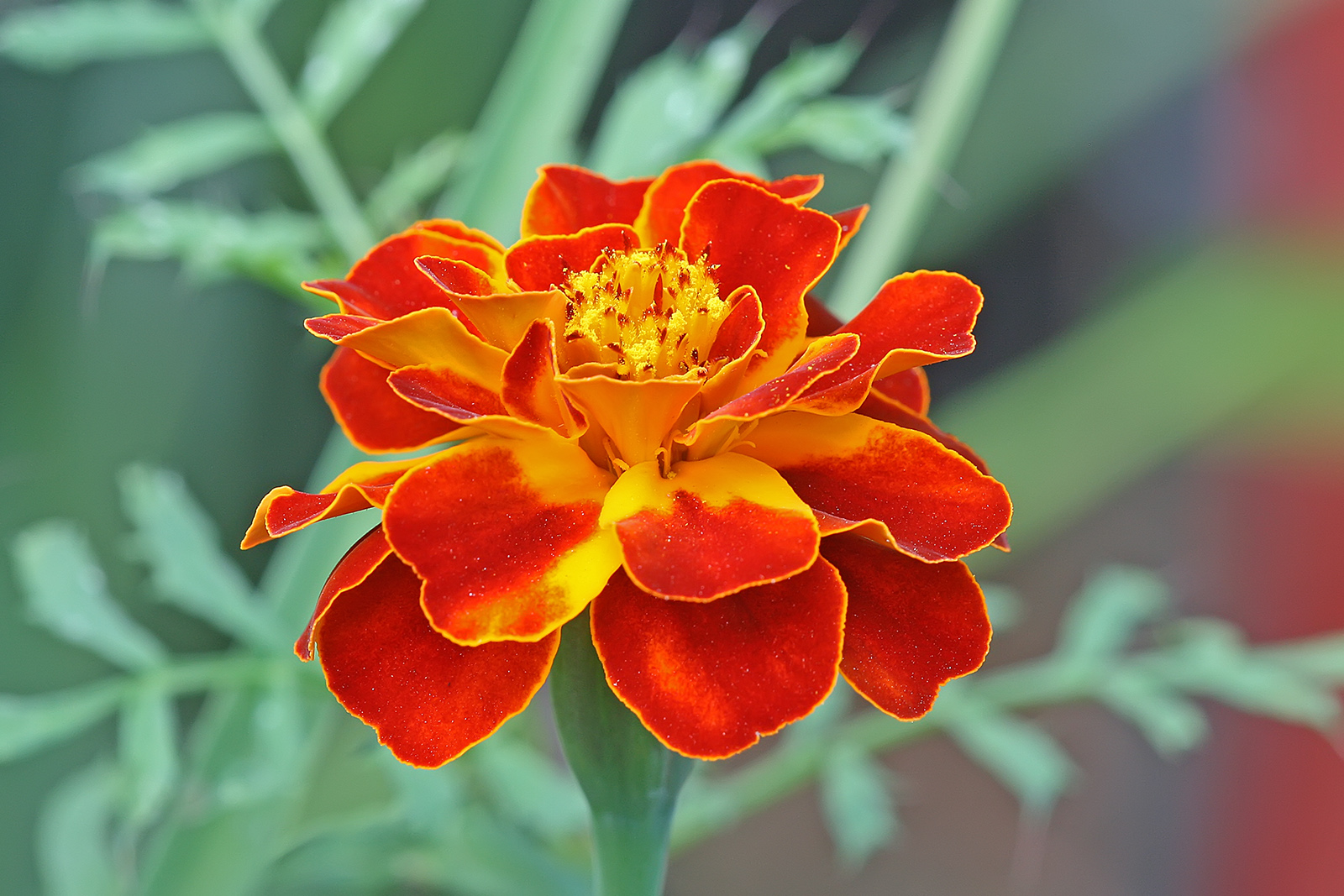

Scientific classification
- Kingdom: Plantae
- Clade: Embryophytes
- Clade: Tracheophytes
- Clade: Angiosperms
- Clade: Eudicots
- Clade: Asterids
- Order: Asterales
- Family: Asteraceae
- Genus: Tagetes
- Species: T. patula

Binomial name
- Tagetes patula L.

Synonyms
- Tagetes corymbosa Sweet; Tagetes lunulata Ortega; Tagetes remotiflora Kunze; Tagetes signata Bartling; Tagetes tenuifolia Millsp.

= Tagetes patula =

French marigold

Species of flowering plant

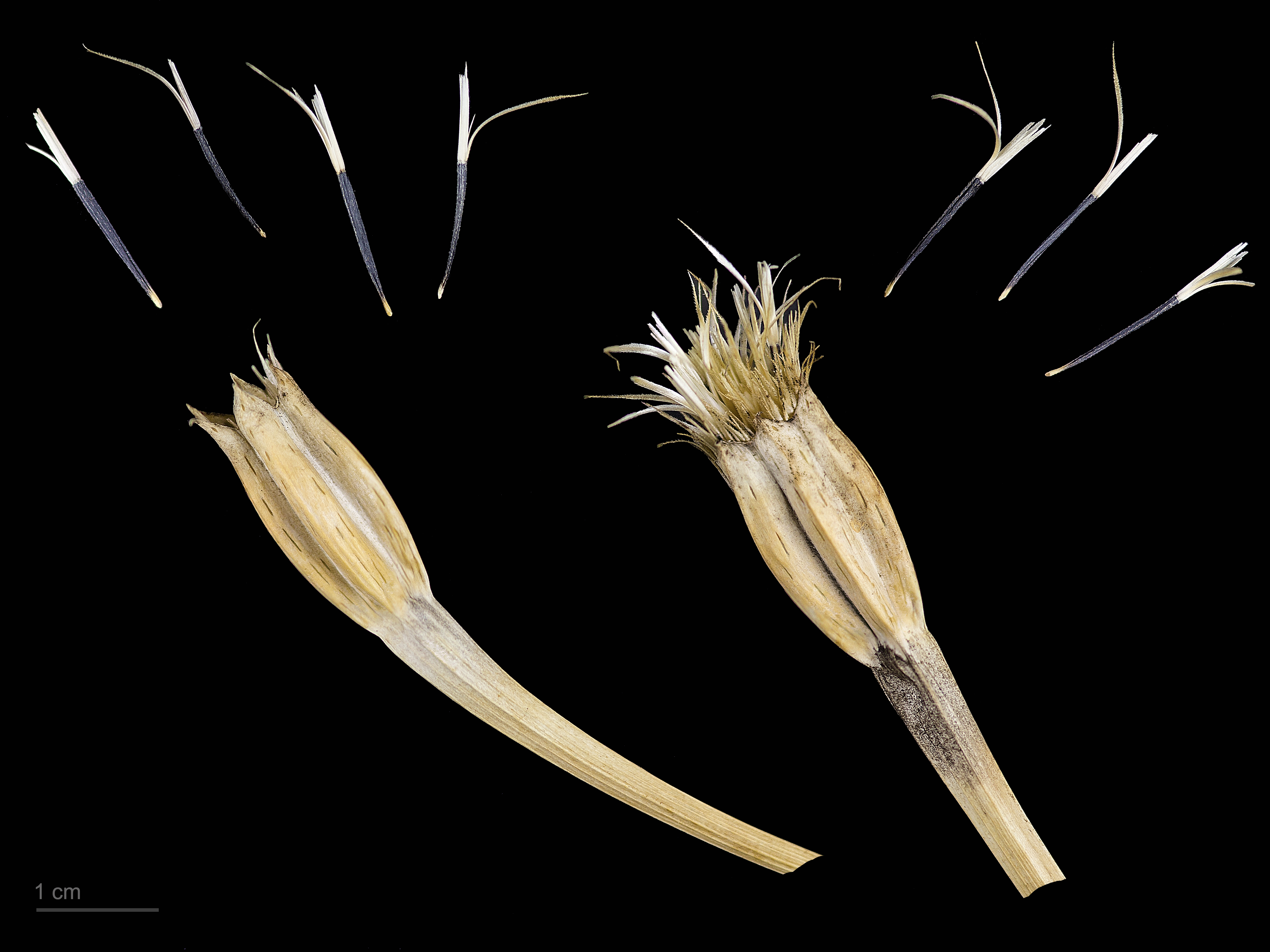
Tagetes patula - MHNT

Tagetes patula, the French marigold, is a species of flowering plant in the family Asteraceae, native to Mexico and Guatemala with several naturalised populations in many other countries. It is widely cultivated as an easily grown bedding plant with hundreds of cultivars, which often have bright yellow to orange flowers.

Some authorities regard Tagetes patula as a synonym of Tagetes erecta, the Mexican marigold.

== Description ==
Tagetes patula is an annual, occasionally reaching 0.5 m (1 1/2 ft) tall by 0.3 m (1 ft) wide. In some climates it flowers from July to October. In its native habitat of the highlands of central Mexico, blooms are produced from September to killing frost. Achenes ripen and are shed within two weeks of the start of bloom. The heads contain mostly hermaphrodite (having both male and female organs) florets and are pollinated primarily by beetles in the wild, as well as by tachinid flies and other insects. The leaves of all species of marigold include oil glands. The oils are pungent. It can grow in both sandy and clay soils provided they have good drainage. It requires full sun to partial shade.

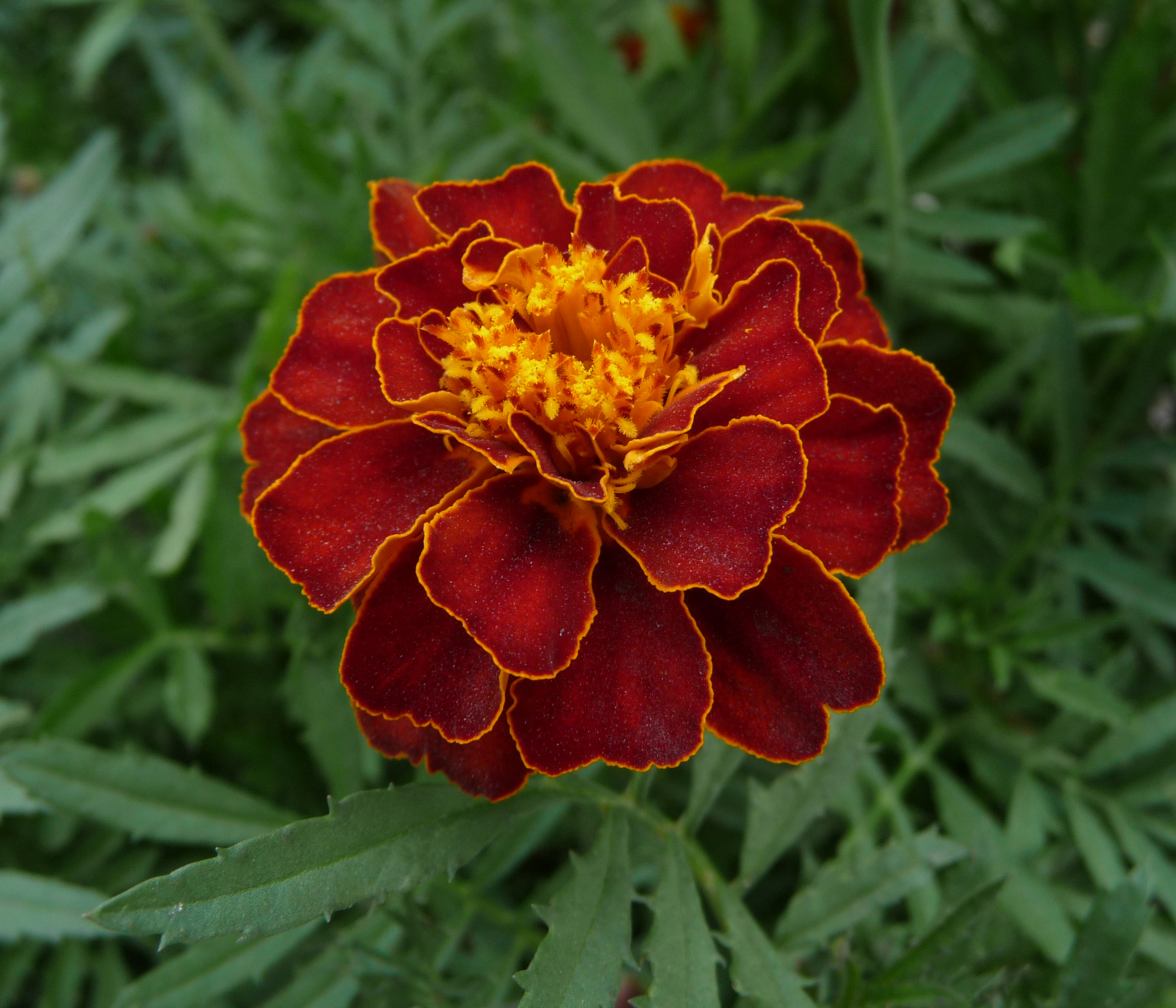
French marigold Tagetes patula, possibly a hybrid cultivar. Ukraine

== Etymology ==
The Latin specific epithet patula means 'with a spreading habit'.

== Cultivation ==
This plant is valued for its velvet-textured, brightly coloured blooms in shades of yellow, orange and russet in summer. It is shorter, and has a more spreading habit, than its relative the Mexican marigold (Tagetes erecta). It is therefore more suitable as an edging plant in the open border.

Moreau et al 2006 attempted to protect Solanum tuberosum (potato) against Leptinotarsa decemlineata (potato beetle) by intercropping with T. patula but instead found it acting as an attractant, resulting in greater infestation and lower yields. (They also found the same for another purported repellent, Armoracia rusticana.)

Tagetes patula is frost intolerant, given a Royal Horticultural Society hardiness rating of H2, capable of surviving temperatures of 1–5 °C (34–41 °F) but killed by freezing temperatures. They are grown by gardeners in moderately fertile, but well-drained soil in full sun with evenly moist conditions.

=== Cultivars ===
Hundreds of cultivars have been developed, of which the following have gained the Royal Horticultural Society's Award of Garden Merit:-

- 'Bonanza Flame'
- Bonanza Series
- 'Dainty Marietta'
- 'Disco Orange'
- 'Disco Yellow'
- 'Fireball'
- 'Hero Orange'
- 'Honeycomb'
- 'Queen Sophia'
- 'Safari Mixture'
- 'Safari Scarlet'
- 'Safari Tangerine'
- 'Tiger Eyes'
- 'Yellow Jacket'
- 'Zenith Golden Yellow'
- 'Zenith Lemon Yellow'
- 'Zenith Yellow'

== Uses ==
=== Culinary ===
The dried and ground flower petals constitute a popular spice in the Republic of Georgia in the Caucasus, where they are known as imeruli shaphrani (= 'Imeretian Saffron') from their pungency and golden colour and particular popularity in the Western province of Imereti. The spice imparts a unique, rather earthy flavour to Georgian cuisine, in which it is considered especially compatible with the flavours of cinnamon and cloves. It is also an essential ingredient in the spice mixture khmeli suneli (reputedly as significant to Georgian cuisine as garam masala is to that of North India).

=== Colouring ===
Tagetes patula florets are grown and harvested annually to add to poultry feed to help give the yolks a golden color. The florets can also be used to color human foods. A golden yellow dye is used to color animal-based textiles (wool, silk) without a mordant, but a mordant is needed for cotton and synthetic textiles.

=== Fragrance ===
The whole plant is harvested when in flower and distilled for its essential oil. The oil is used in perfumery. It is blended with sandalwood oil to produce 'attar genda' perfume. About 35 kg (77 lb) of oil can be extracted from 1 hectare (2.5 acres) of the plant yielding 2,500 kg (5,500 lb) of flowers and 25,000 kg (55,000 lb) of herbage.

=== Other ===
Many cultures use medicinal infusions from dried leaves or florets. Research also suggests that the essential oil has the ability to be used as residual pesticide against bedbugs.

The essential oil is being investigated for antifungal activity, including treatment of candidiasis and treating fungal infections in plants.

== Gallery ==
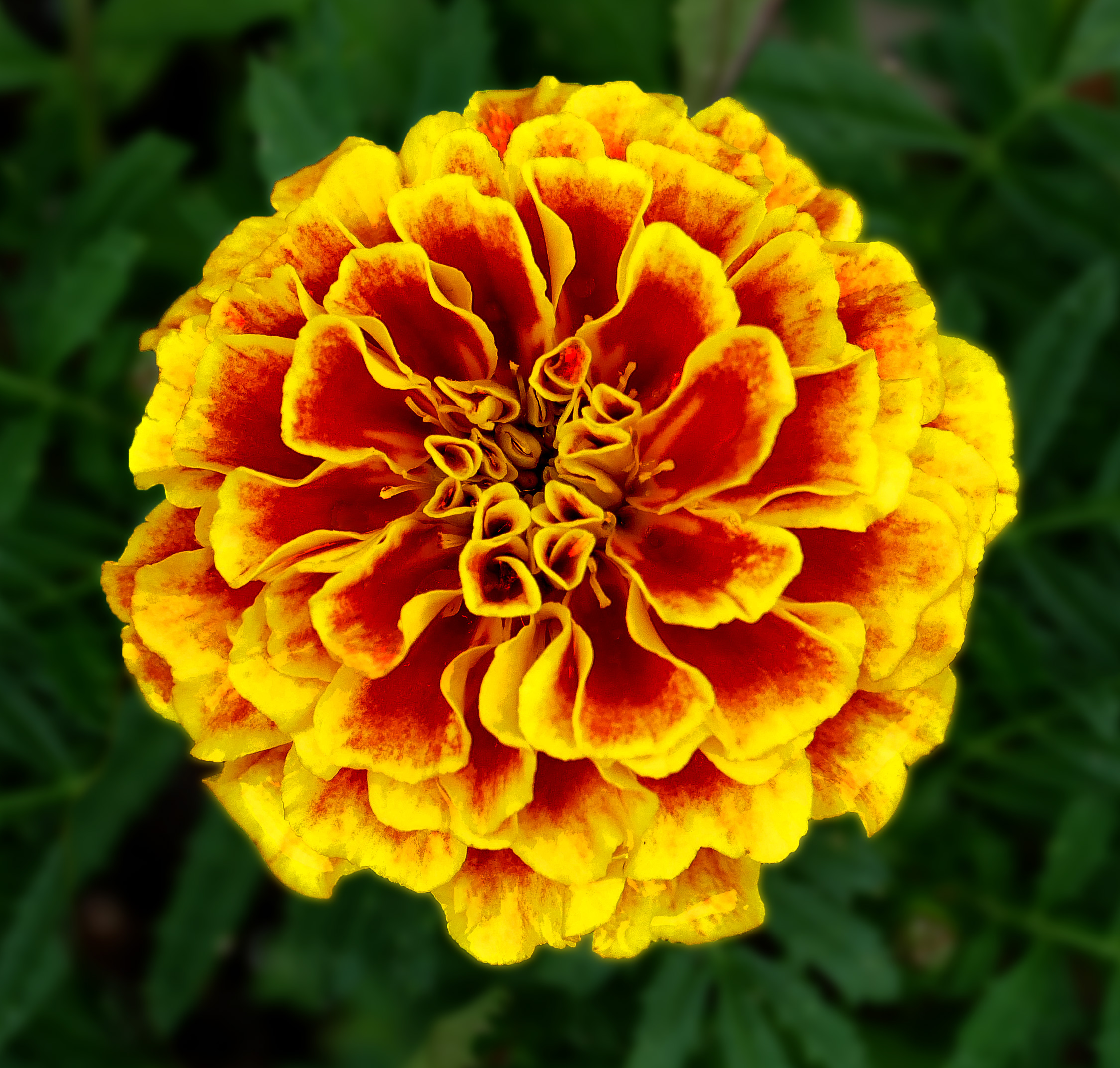
French Marigold—October Birthday Flower—Tagetes patula

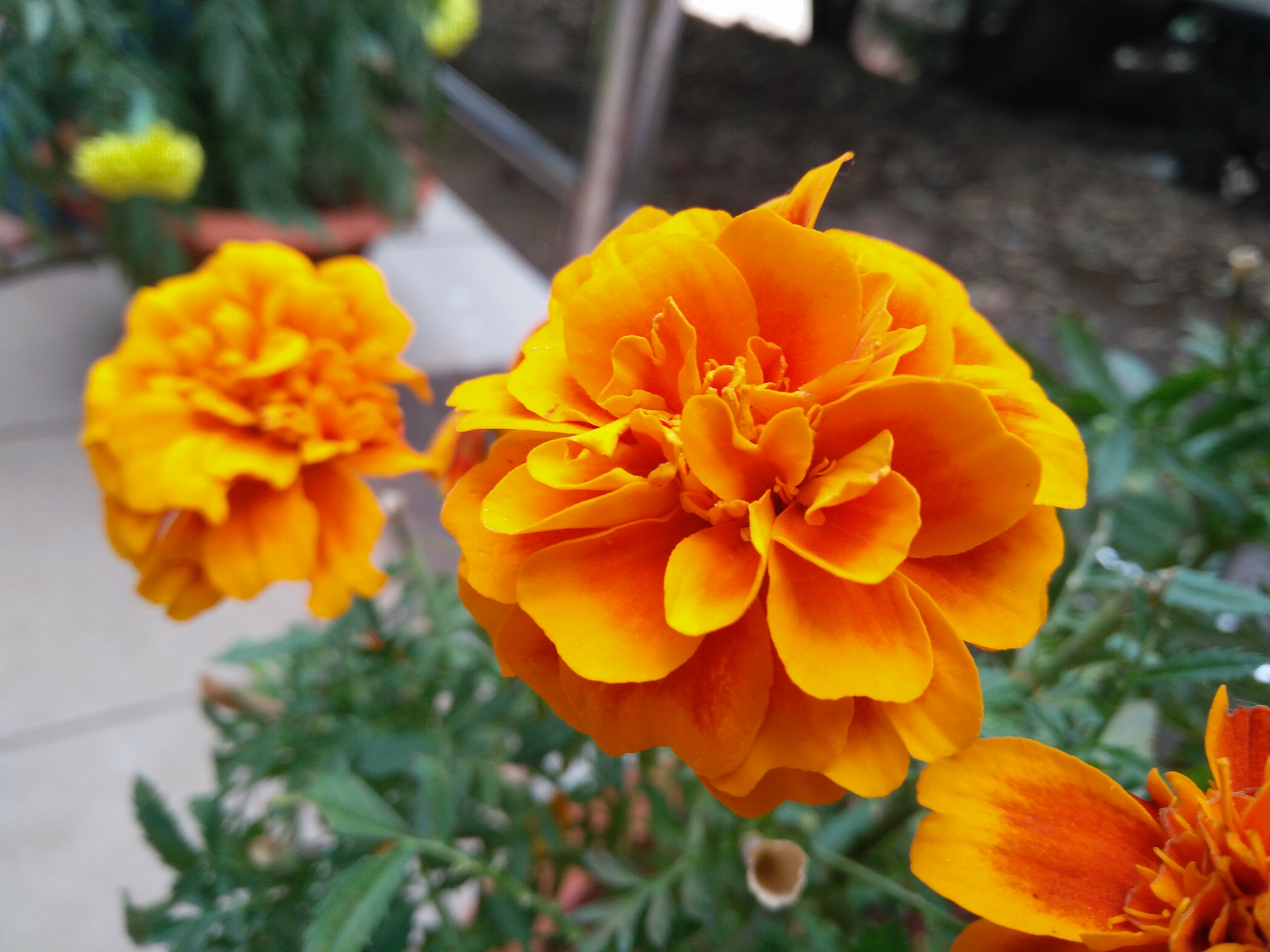
Marigold flower

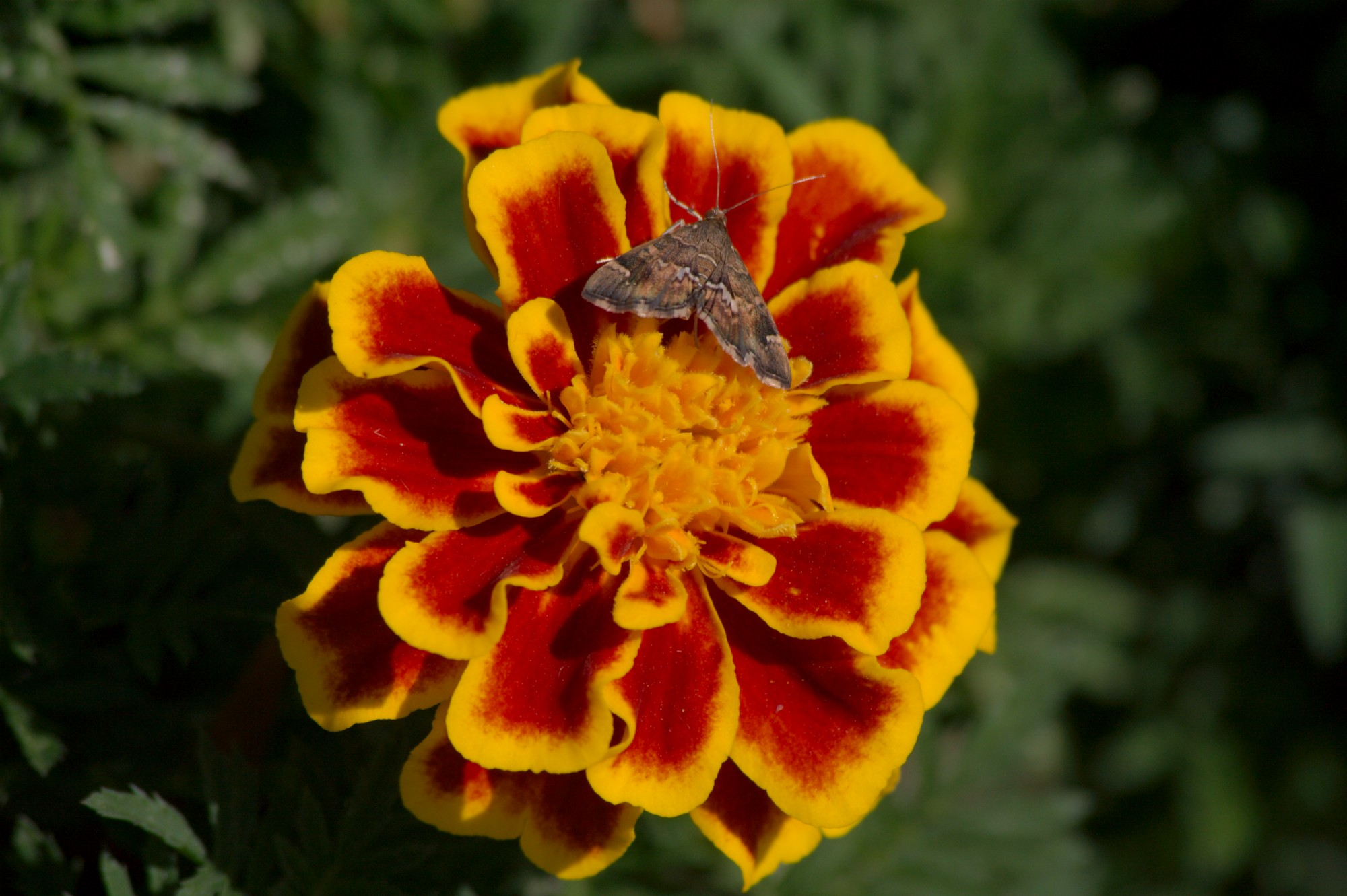
Moth on flower

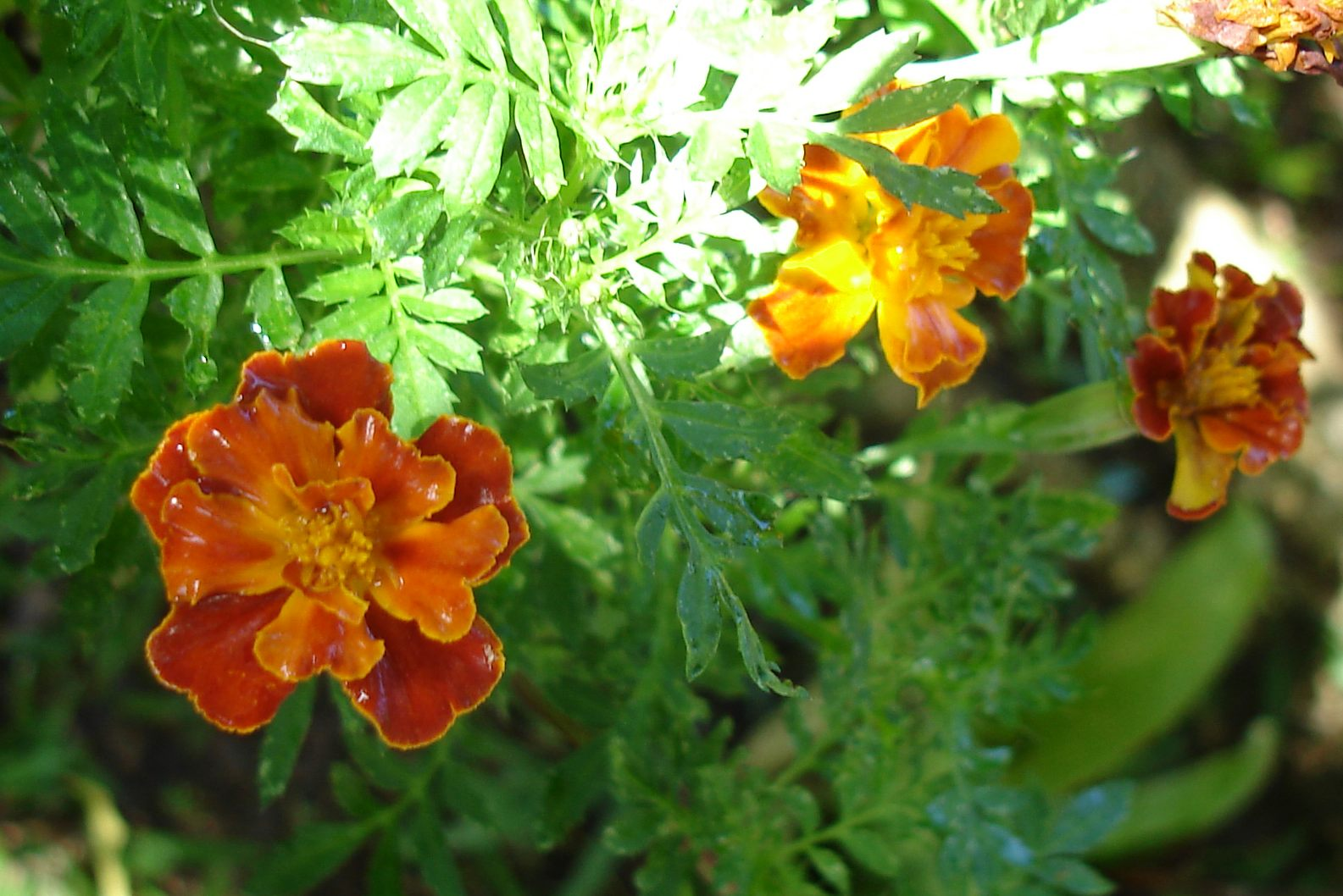
Bunch of flowers

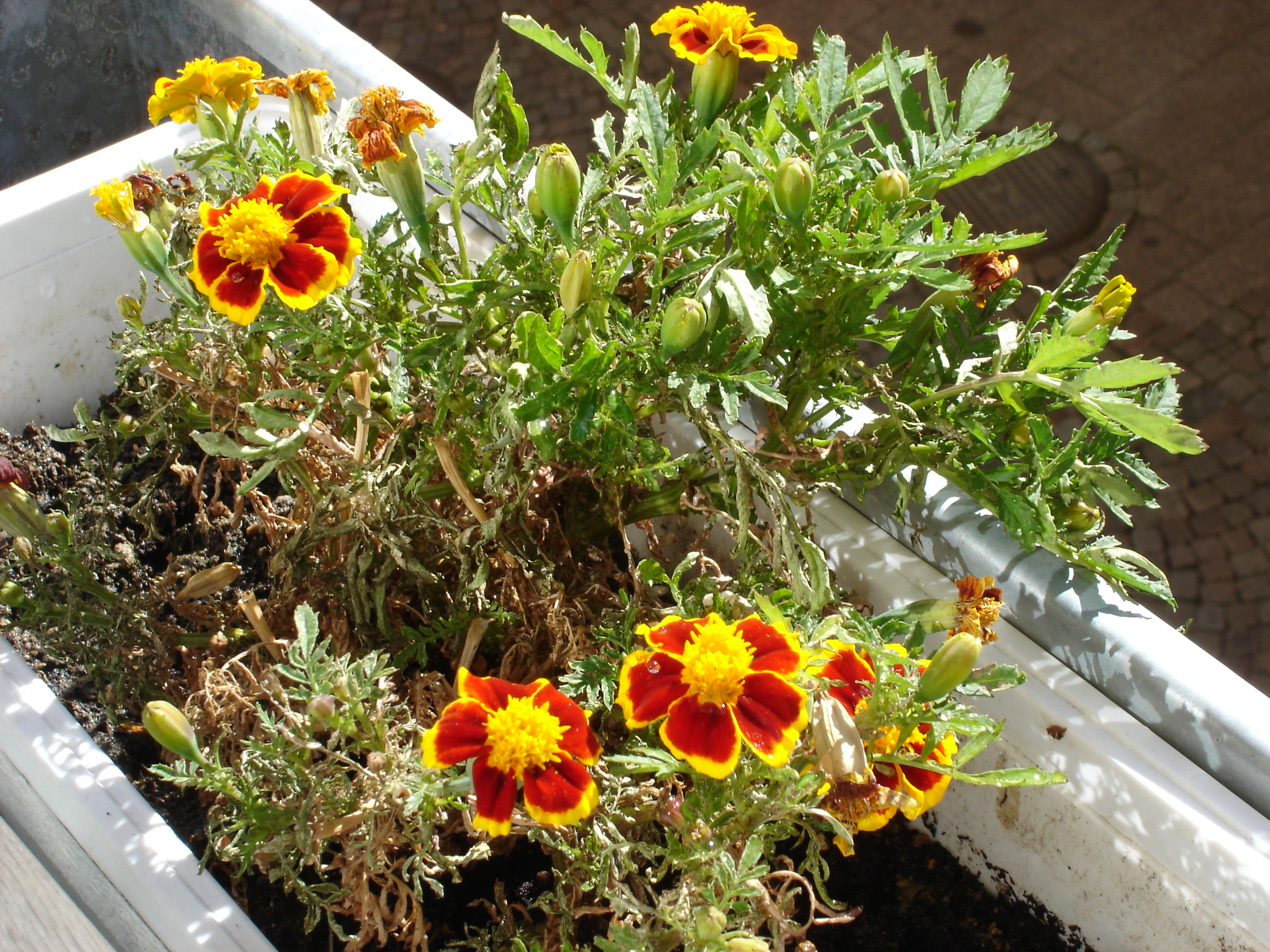
On a plant pot

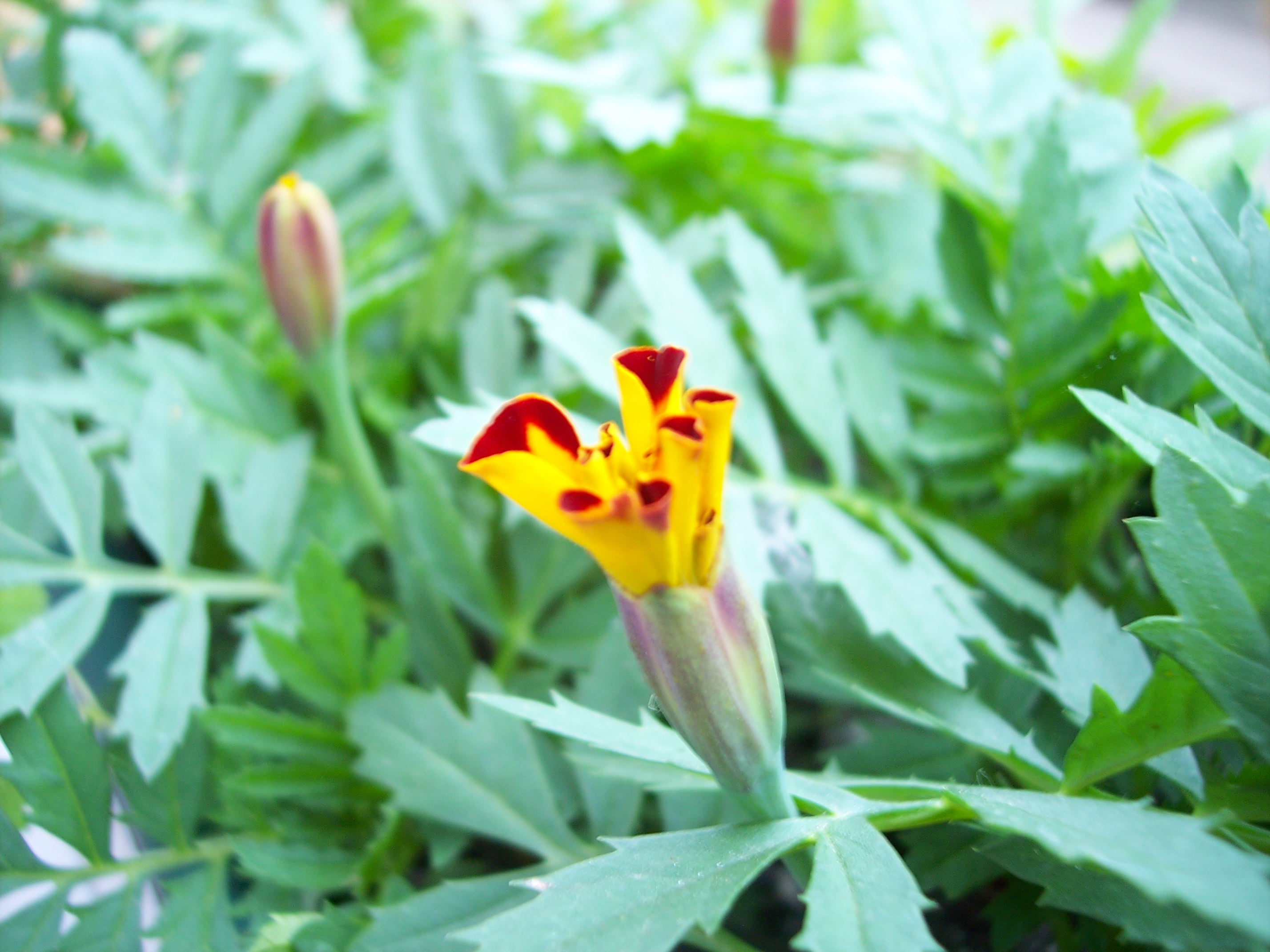
Emerging flower

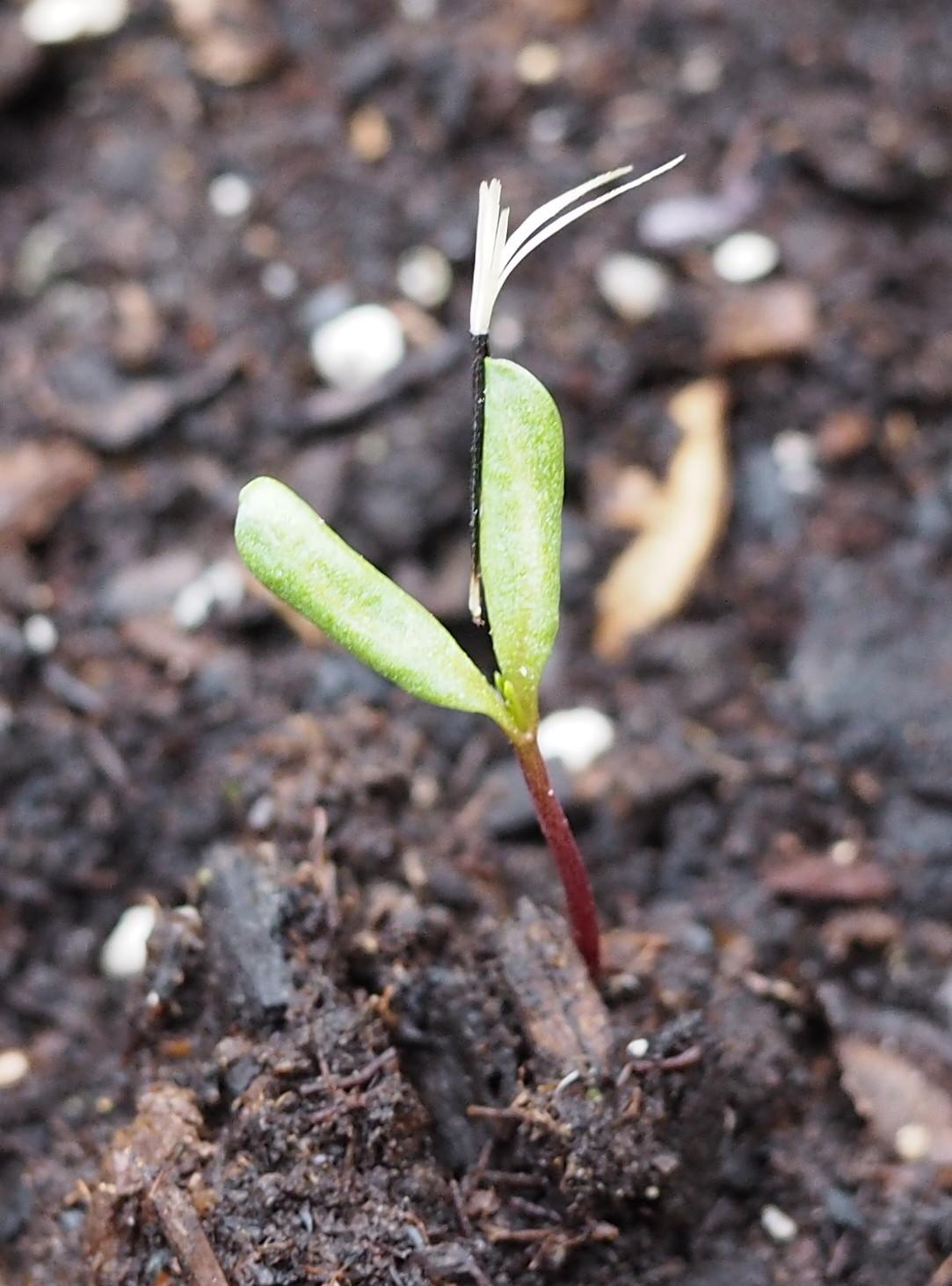
Sprouting germ

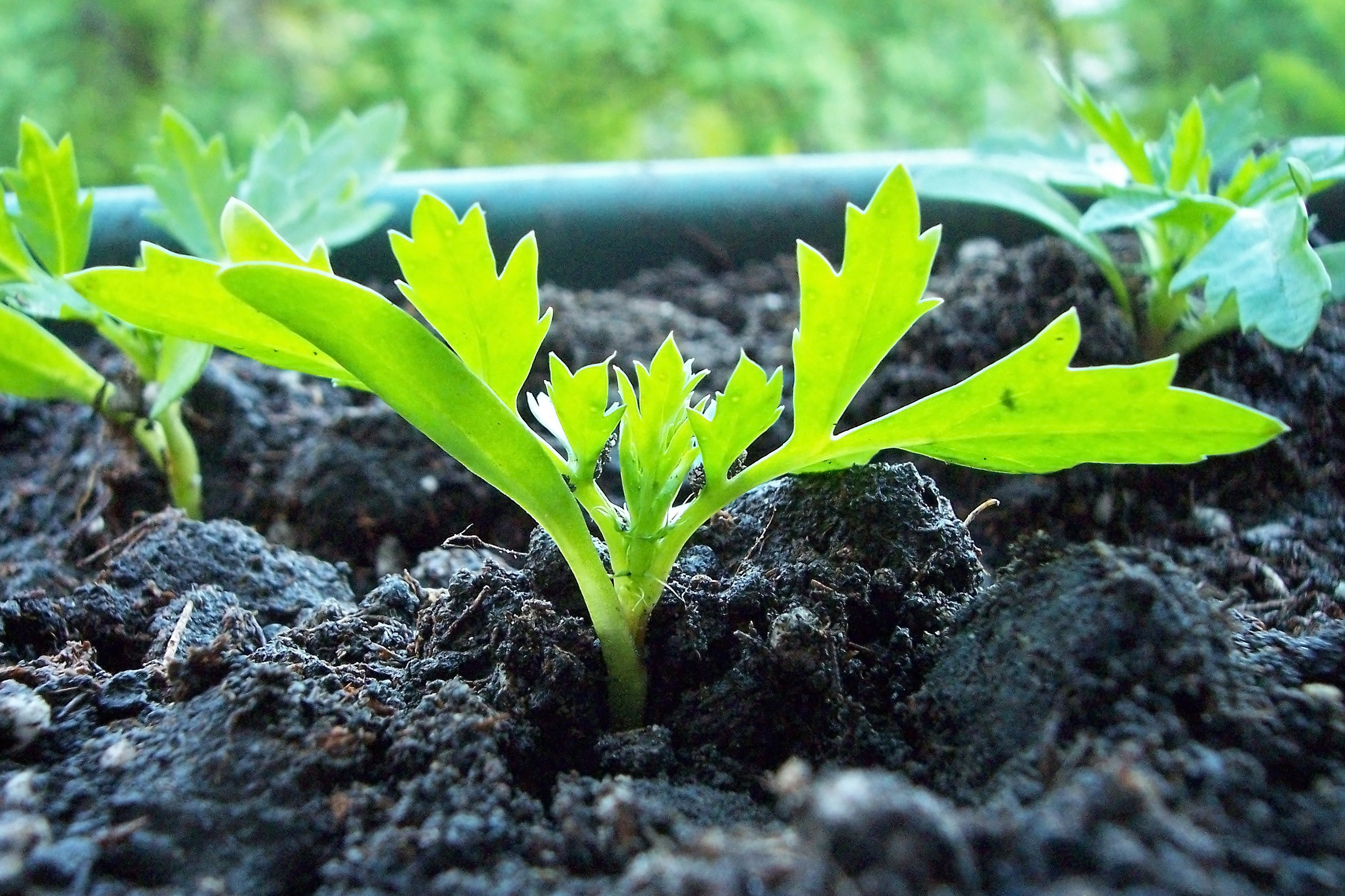
Sprouting shoots

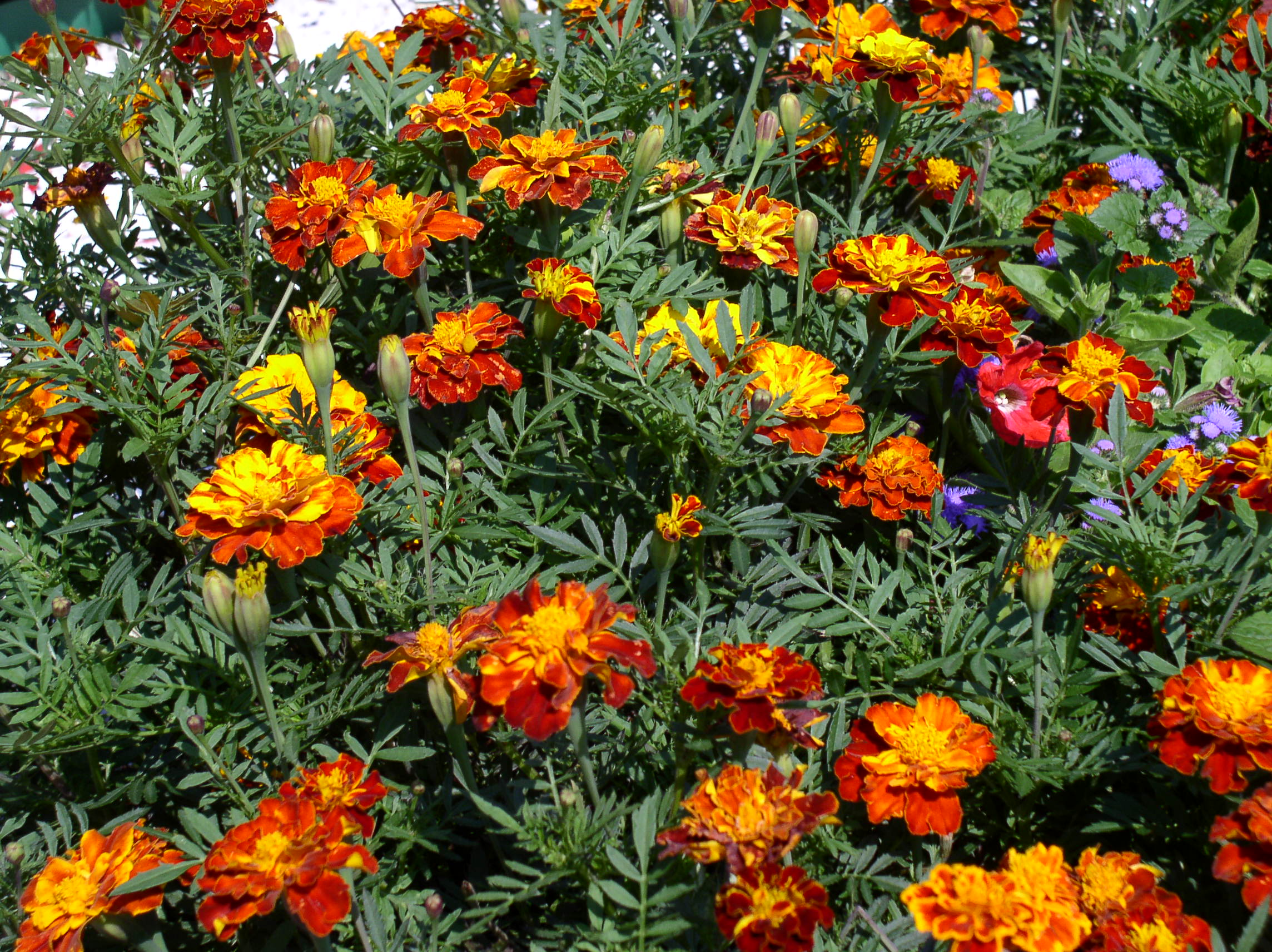
Flowerbed

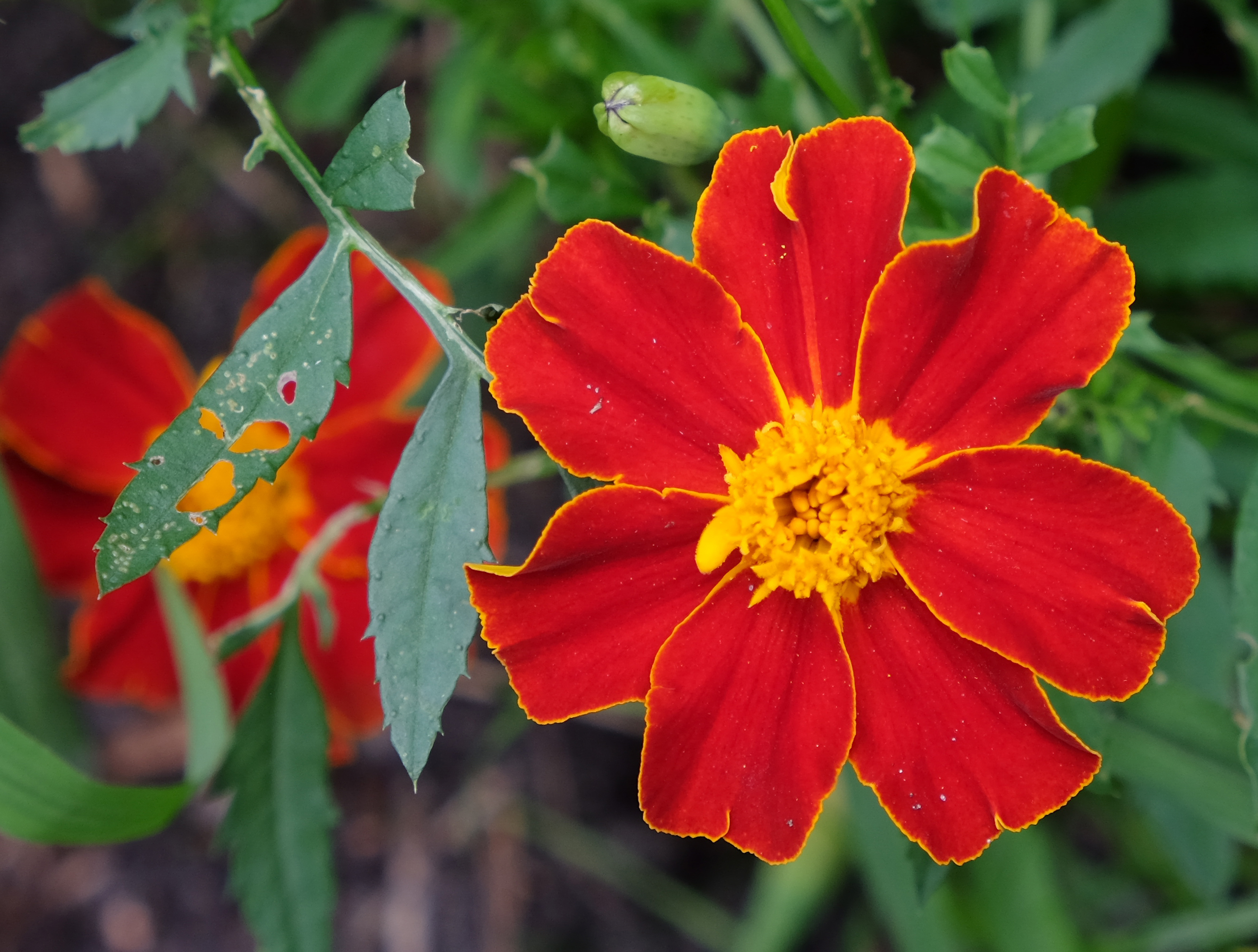
Red Tagetes flower
