= In Degrees =

Single by English indie rock band Foals

Single by Foals

from the album Everything Not Saved Will Be Lost – Part 1
- Released: 10 May 2019
- Recorded: 2018
- Studio: 123 (London, England)
- Genre: Indie rock; alternative dance; electronica
- Length: 4:58
- Label: Transgressive; Warner Bros.
- Songwriters: Jack Bevan; Edwin Congreave; Yannis Philippakis; Jimmy Smith
- Producers: Yannis Philippakis; Foals; Brett Shaw

Foals singles chronology
"Sunday" (2019)	"In Degrees" (2019)	"Black Bull" (2019)

"In Degrees" is the fourth single by British indie rock band, Foals off their fifth studio album, Everything Not Saved Will Be Lost – Part 1. The single, released 10 May 2019 was supplemented by a house/club remix by German EDM producer/DJ Purple Disco Machine and an official music video which premiered a few days later on 15 May 2019.

== Music video ==
The music video, directed by Aaron Brown, was released 15 May 2019.

Filmed in Brazil, the video features the band, including touring members Jeremy Pritchard and Kit Montieth, dressed in tropical apparel performing within the "Ilha Musical" (Musical Island), an amphitheater (a notable tourist attraction for its brutalist design by Décio Tozzi) located in the Villa-Lobos State Park in São Paulo during an outdoor rave between sunset and nightfall.

== Track listing ==
Promo single
No.	Title	Length
1.	"In Degrees"	4:58
2.	"In Degrees (Purple Disco Machine)"	6:37

== Charts ==
Chart (2019)	Peak position
Mexico Airplay (Billboard)	36
Mexico Ingles Airplay (Billboard)	1
New Zealand Hot Singles (RMNZ)	34
UK Singles (OCC)	82
