= Kharcho =

Traditional Georgian soup

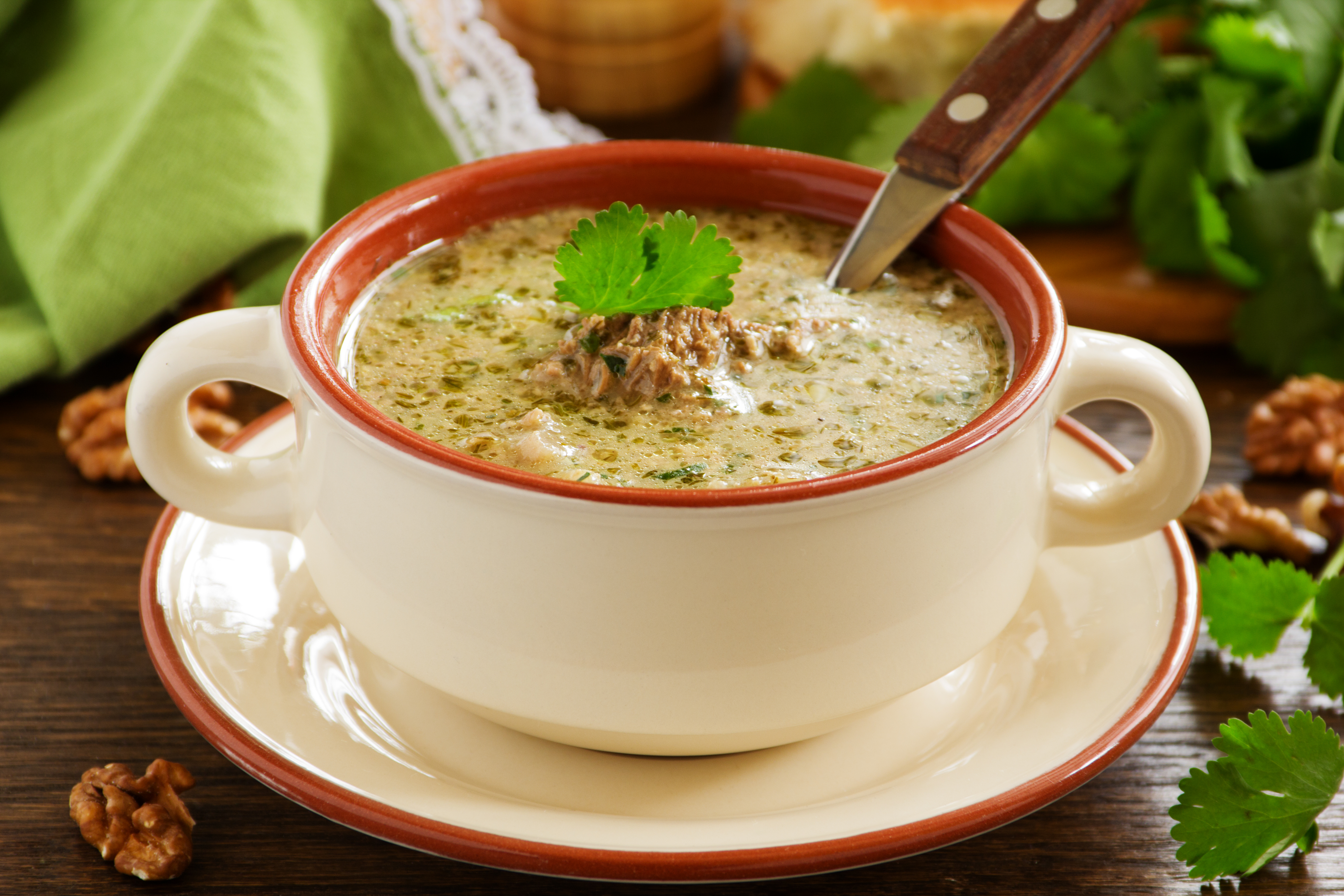
- Type: Soup
- Place of origin: Georgia
- Main ingredients: Meat (beef), rice, cherry plum purée, khmeli-suneli
- Variations: Walnuts

Kharcho, also spelled Harcho (Georgian: ხარჩო), is a traditional Georgian soup containing beef, rice, cherry plum purée, and chopped walnuts (Juglans regia), but they are not compulsory. The soup is seasoned with Khmeli Suneli and coriander. The soup is usually served with finely chopped fresh coriander. The characteristic ingredients of the soup are meat (usually fatty cuts of beef), cherry plum purée made from tklapi or tkemali, rice, chopped walnuts, and a spice mix that varies between different regions of Georgia.

Typically, kharcho is made with beef, and the Georgian name of this soup, "dzrokhis khortsis kharcho", literally translates as “cow’s meat kharcho.”

In the Samegrelo region, Megrelian kharcho is made as a stew rather than a soup. Rice is excluded and it is typically served over a bed of ghomi (Georgian polenta).

== See also ==
- List of soups
