= Everything Not Saved Will Be Lost – Part 1 =

Studio album by Foals
- Released: 8 March 2019
- Recorded: 2018
- Studio: 123 (London)
- Genre: Indie rock; dance-rock; dance-punk
- Length: 39:04
- Label: Warner Bros.; Transgressive
- Producer: Foals; Brett Shaw

Foals chronology
What Went Down (2015)	Everything Not Saved Will Be Lost – Part 1 (2019)	Everything Not Saved Will Be Lost – Part 2 (2019)

Singles from Everything Not Saved Will Be Lost – Part 1
- 1. "Exits" Released: 21 January 2019; 2. "On the Luna" Released: 14 February 2019; 3. "Sunday" Released: 25 February 2019; 4. "In Degrees" Released: 10 May 2019

Alternative cover
- "Part 1: Remixes"

Everything Not Saved Will Be Lost – Part 1 is the fifth studio album by British rock band Foals. It was released on 8 March 2019 through Warner Bros. and Transgressive Records. The album is considered the first half of a two-piece project, being supplemented by their consecutive sixth studio album Everything Not Saved Will Be Lost – Part 2, later released on 18 October 2019. This is their first album not to feature founding member and bassist Walter Gervers, as it was during the period of his amicable hiatus in 2018 (and eventual return to the group in 2023).

An alternative version of the album was digitally released 15 September 2019 featuring a compilation of remixes/edits from the band's musical peers and contemporaries (including Metronomy, George FitzGerald, Alex Metric, Purple Disco Machine, etc.) within the realms of EDM, drum & bass, and house music.

The album received a nomination for the prestigious Mercury Prize in July 2019.

== Promotion and release ==
In January 2019, the band released a series of three short teaser clips featuring cinematic vignettes of the yet-to-be-released music video through their social media to announce the release dates of both parts of the album on 8 March 2019 and in autumn 2019 respectively. The third teaser, featuring a group of politicians physically assaulting each other in parliament court and a quick strobed, stylised shot, the band announced the release of the first single "Exits", which debuted on DJ Annie Mac's BBC Radio 1 show on 21 January. In promotion of "Exits", on 16 January, the band's marketing team created a scavenger hunt through social media by posting GPS coordinates along with photos of branded envelopes taped to various doorway exits of public transit and train stations around the world, such as New York, London, Paris, Mexico and Tokyo for fans to collect. The envelopes contained lyrics to "Exits" before its release.

On 14 February, the band premiered the album's second single, "On The Luna" via Annie Mac's BBC Radio 1 show once again. Along with the release, was the announcement of a string of small, warm-up shows in the UK before the start of their 2019 North American & European spring/summer tour. On 25 February, the album's third single "Sunday" premiered via Zane Lowe's Beats 1 radio program.

== Album artwork and title ==
Everything Not Saved Will Be Lost – Part 1 features album artwork from Ecuadorian artist Vicente Muñoz. The image was created using infrared film, which captures infrared signal rather than visible light to contrast vegetation with the built environment. This image is part of his ongoing series, Sublimis, which explores the inevitable struggle of man against nature in the urban environment.

The album's title is taken from the epigraph of the T. Michael Martin novel The End Games (ISBN 978-0-06-220180-5), which claims "Everything not saved will be lost" originated as a "Nintendo 'Quit Screen' message". Although Martin in fact adapted the quote from the Nintendo Wii 'Quit Screen' message: "Anything not saved will be lost". The quote has become a cultural meme, featured on the front page of Reddit many times over, serving as the name and inspiration for several international art exhibits, and shared countless times across all major social media platforms.

== Critical reception ==
Professional ratings
Aggregate scores
Source	Rating
AnyDecentMusic?	7.5/10
Metacritic	78/100
Review scores
Source	Rating
AllMusic	3.5/5 stars
The Guardian	4/5 stars
The Independent	5/5 stars
The Irish Times	4/5 stars
Mojo	3/5 stars
NME	5/5 stars
Pitchfork	6.0/10
Q	4/5 stars
Rolling Stone	2.5/5 stars
Uncut	7/10

=== Accolades ===
Publication	List	Rank	Ref.
Afisha Daily (Russia)	The Best Foreign Albums of 2019	7	
GQ (Russia)	The 20 Best Albums of 2019	—	

== Track listing ==
No.	Title	Length
1.	"Moonlight"	2:39
2.	"Exits"	5:57
3.	"White Onions"	3:05
4.	"In Degrees"	4:57
5.	"Syrups"	5:28
6.	"On the Luna"	3:12
7.	"Cafe D'Athens"	4:06
8.	"Surf, Pt.1"	0:44
9.	"Sunday"	5:54
10.	"I'm Done with the World (& It's Done with Me)"	3:02
Total length:		39:04

Part 1: Remixes
No.	Title	Length
1.	"On the Luna (Metronomy Remix)"	4:15
2.	"Sunday (Tensnake Remix)"	5:34
3.	"In Degrees (Purple Disco Machine Remix)"	6:36
4.	"Cafe D’Athens (TSHA Remix)"	5:38
5.	"Syrups (Vincent Taurelle Remix)"	5:53
6.	"Sunday (Alex Metric Remix)"	7:17
7.	"Exits (Lawrence Hart and Little Cub Remix)"	5:47
8.	"Exits (PARD Remix)"	7:02
9.	"Sunday (Lake Turner Remix)"	4:51
10.	"Exits (George FitzGerald Remix)"	5:01

== Personnel ==
- Yannis Philippakis – vocals, guitar, bass, keyboards
- Jimmy Smith – guitar, keyboards
- Jack Bevan – drums
- Edwin Congreave – keyboards, synthesizers, bass

Additional musicians

- Duncan Tootill – horns
- Sam Scott – horns
- Vincent Taeger – percussion
- Edith Langley – backing vocals
- Jules Rendell – backing vocals
- Mica Townsend – backing vocals

Technical personnel

- Foals – producers
- Brett Shaw – producer, engineering
- James Ford – additional production, recording assistant
- Tony Allen – additional production
- Vincent Taurelle – additional production
- Rob Wilks – engineering, programming
- Mark "Spike" Stent – mixing
- Michael Freeman – mixing
- Randy Merrill – mastering
- Mike Lythgoe – art direction
- Vicente Muñoz – artwork photography

== Charts ==
=== Weekly charts ===
Weekly chart performance for Everything Not Saved Will Be Lost – Part 1
Chart (2019)	Peak position
Australian Albums (ARIA)	11
Austrian Albums (Ö3 Austria)	27
Belgian Albums (Ultratop Flanders)	17
Belgian Albums (Ultratop Wallonia)	19
Canadian Albums (Billboard)	26
Dutch Albums (Album Top 100)	22
French Albums (SNEP)	17
German Albums (Offizielle Top 100)	15
Hungarian Albums (MAHASZ)	7
Irish Albums (IRMA)	10
Italian Albums (FIMI)	78
Japanese Albums (Oricon)	164
Lithuanian Albums (AGATA)	10
Portuguese Albums (AFP)	39
New Zealand Albums (RMNZ)	35
Scottish Albums (OCC)	1
Spanish Albums (PROMUSICAE)	33
Swiss Albums (Schweizer Hitparade)	15
UK Albums (OCC)	2
US Billboard 200	58

=== Year-end charts ===
Year-end chart performance for Everything Not Saved Will Be Lost – Part 1
Chart (2019)	Position
UK Albums (OCC)	93

== Certifications ==
Certifications for Everything Not Saved Will Be Lost - Part 1
Region	Certification	Certified units/sales
United Kingdom (BPI)	Gold	100,000^{‡}
^{‡} Sales+streaming figures based on certification alone.
