= Ajika =

Georgian dip

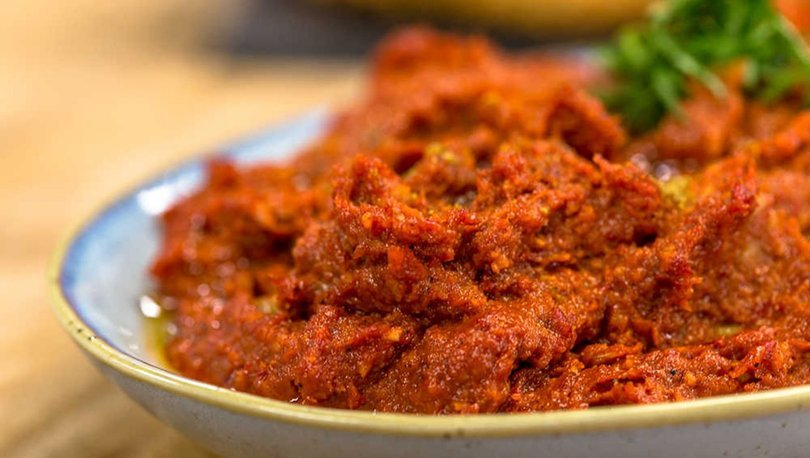
- Megrelian spicy ajika
- Alternative names: Adjika
- Course: Dip
- Region or state: Abkhazia (Note: The political status of Abkhazia is disputed. Having unilaterally declared independence from Georgia in 1992, Abkhazia is formally recognised as an independent state by 4 UN member states (three other states previously recognised it but then withdrew their recognition), while the remainder of the international community recognizes it as de jure Georgian territory. Georgia continues to claim the area as its own territory, designating it as Russian-occupied territory.), Mingrelia
- Main ingredients: Red peppers, garlic, herbs and spices, salt, and walnut

Ajika (Georgian: აჯიკა, romanized: ajik'a) is a flavored sauce or dip made mainly in Abkhazia and Mingrelia regions (Georgia). It is often used to flavor food. Ajika is primarily capsicum-based and usually includes other spices such as coriander or utskho suneli. Common varieties of ajika resemble Italian red pesto in appearance and consistency, although a dry version also exists. Though it is usually red, green ajika is also made with unripe peppers.

The dish is also prepared in Sakarya, Turkey among the Abaza people and is patented by the Turkish Patent and Trademark Office.

In 2018, ajika was included on the Intangible Cultural Heritage of Georgia list.

== Origin ==
The word ajika comes from the Abkhaz language and means 'salt'. However, in the Mingrelian language, a sharp linguistic distinction is maintained: the native word for salt is jim (ჯიმჷ), while ajika (აჯიკა) refers exclusively to the spicy condiment. While the name is a Northwest Caucasian loanword, the dish is a defining staple of Mingrelian cuisine. In the Abkhaz language, the condiment is formally known as apyrpyl-jika (pepper-salt), whereas the standalone term ajika became the standardized name for the specific Mingrelian preparation. This distinction confirms that in the Mingrelian tradition, Ajika is not a synonym for salt, but a unique, processed condiment.

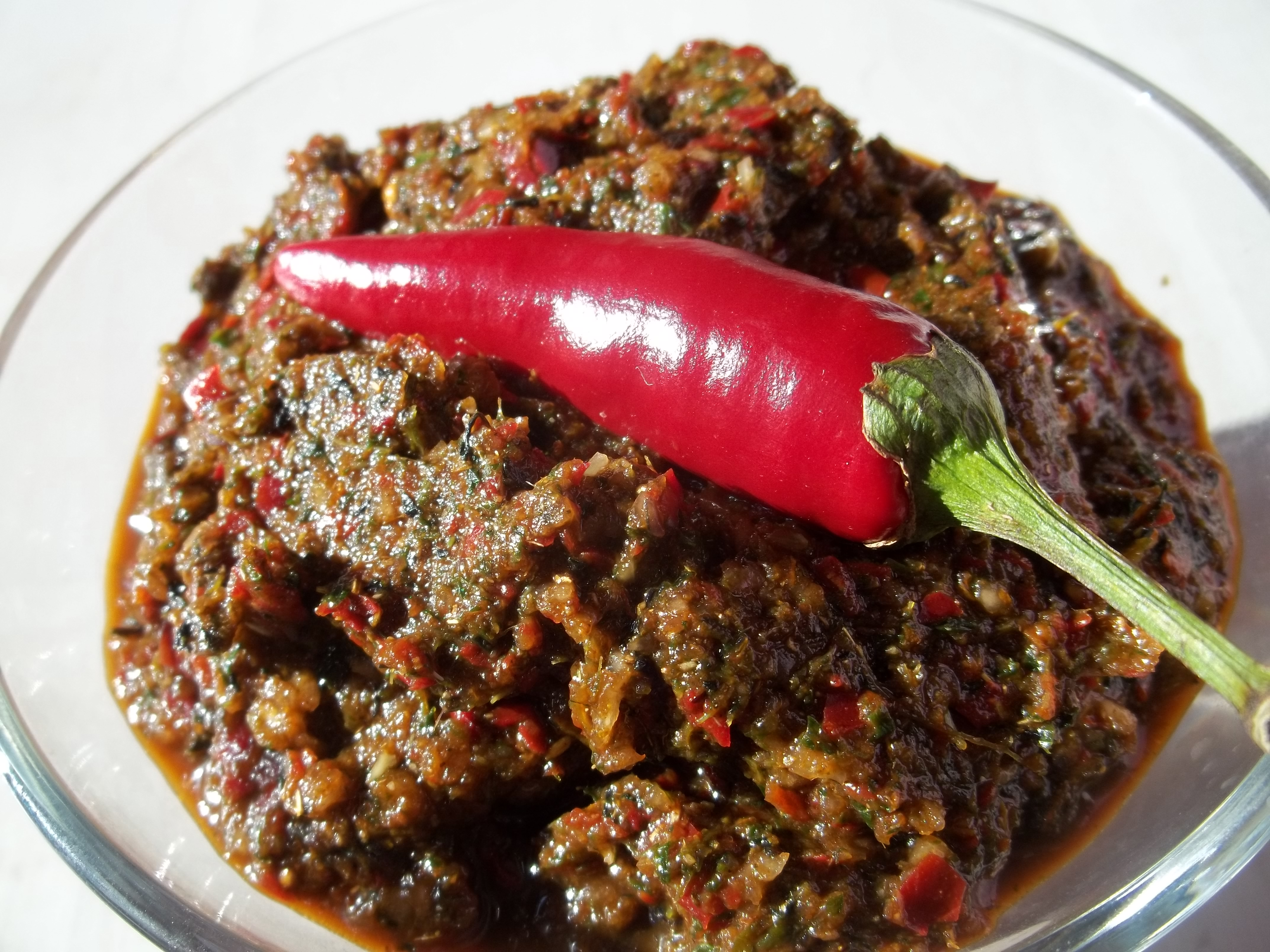
Mingrelian ajika

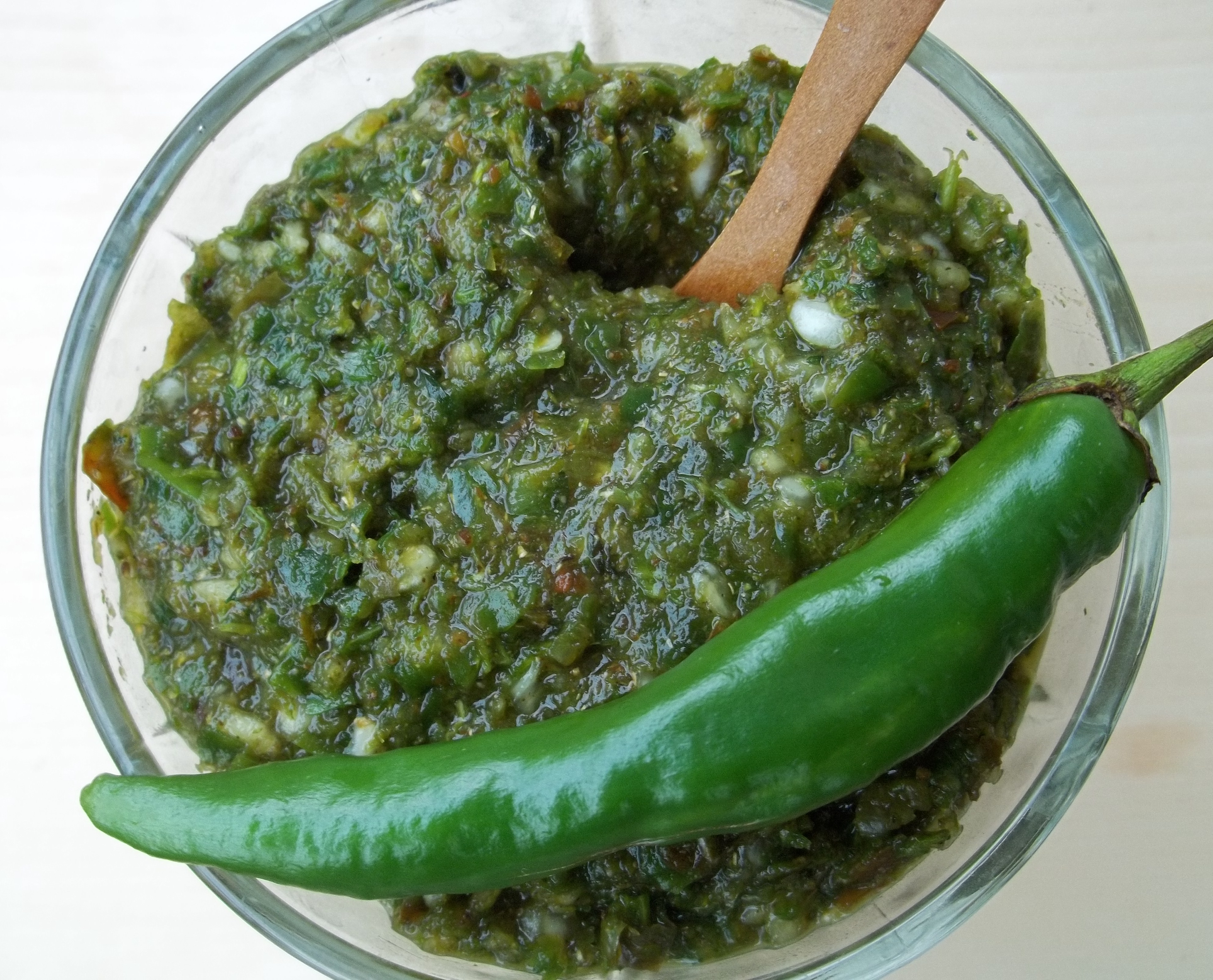
Green ajika

== See also ==
- Biber salçası, a hot or sweet pepper paste in Turkish cuisine
- Chili sauce and paste
- List of dips
- Erős Pista, a well-known Hungarian pepper sauce
- Harissa, a hot chili pepper paste in Maghreb cuisine
- List of sauces
- Muhammara, a hot pepper dip in Levantine cuisine
- Zhug, a hot sauce in Middle Eastern cuisine, made from fresh hot peppers seasoned with coriander, garlic and various spices
