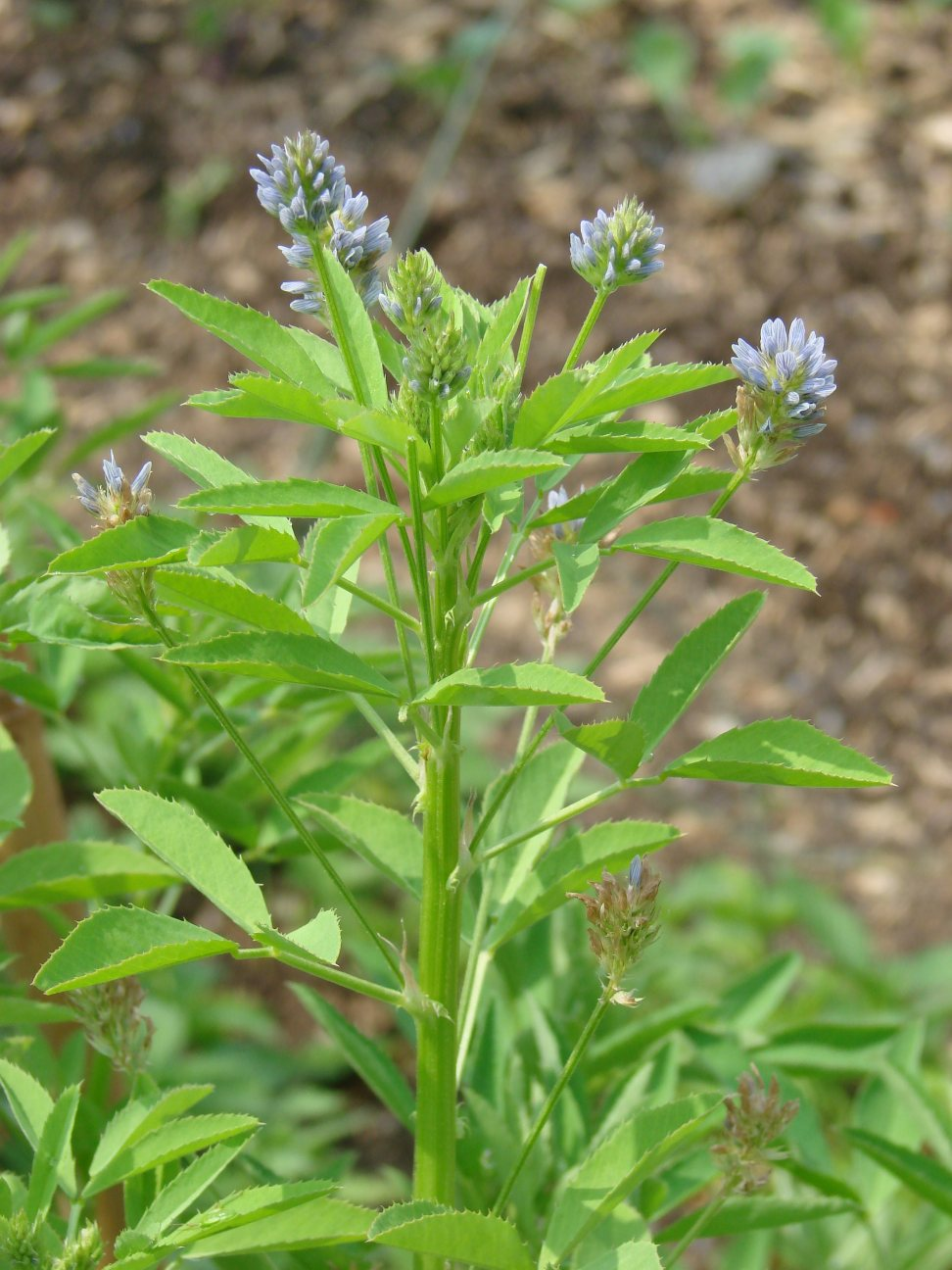

Scientific classification
- Kingdom: Plantae
- Clade: Tracheophytes
- Clade: Angiosperms
- Clade: Eudicots
- Clade: Rosids
- Order: Fabales
- Family: Fabaceae
- Subfamily: Faboideae
- Genus: Trigonella
- Species: T. caerulea

Binomial name
- Trigonella caerulea (L.) Ser.

= Trigonella caerulea =

Blue fenugreek

Species of flowering plant

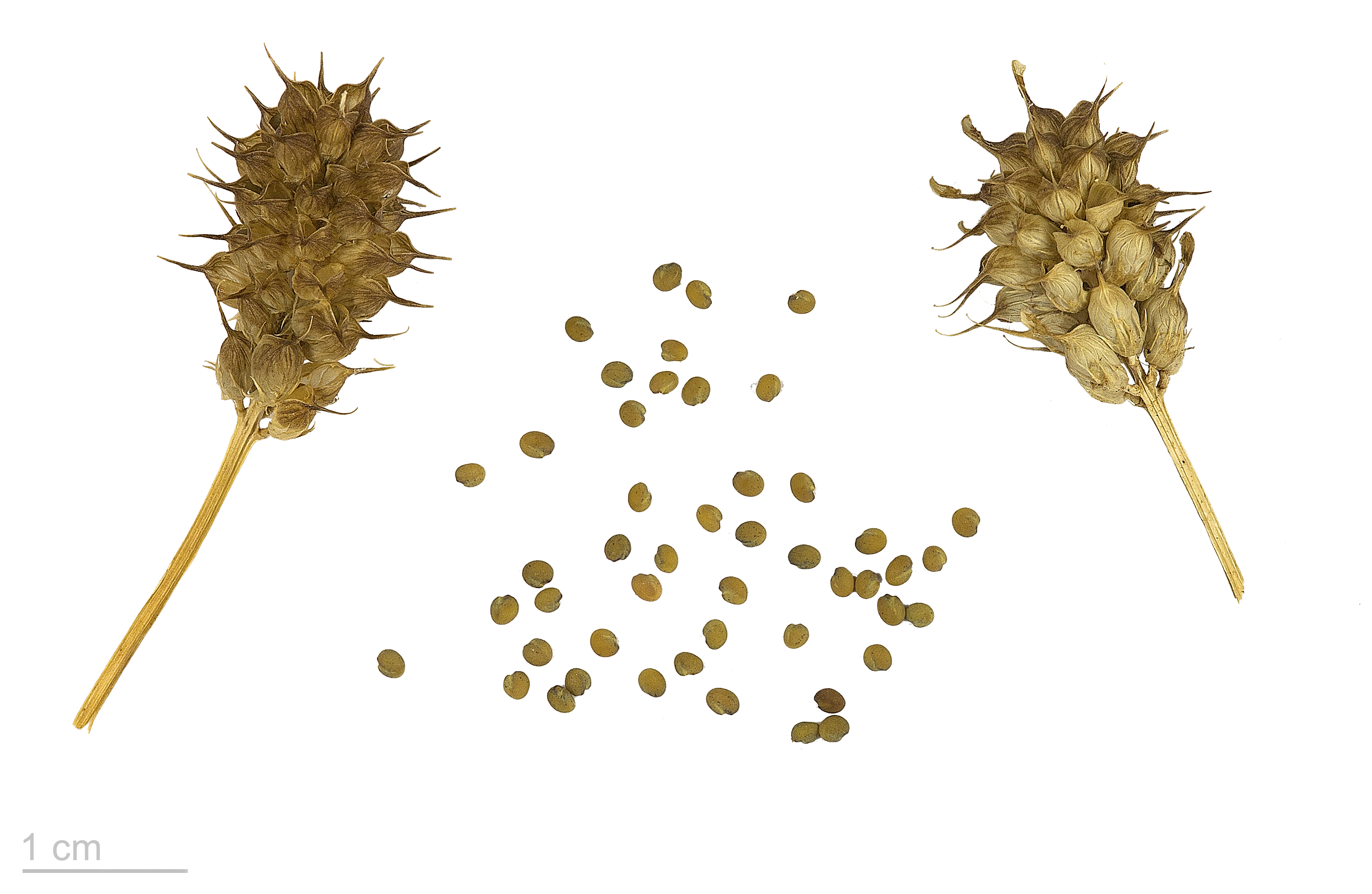
Trigonella caerulea - MHNT

Trigonella caerulea (blue fenugreek, blue melilot) is an annual herb in the family Fabaceae. It is 30–60 cm tall. Its leaves are obovate or lance-shaped, 2–5 cm long, 1–2 cm wide and saw-toothed in upper part. Its flower stalks are compact, globular racemes, longer than the leaves. The sepals are twice as long as the corolla, its teeth are equal to the tube. The corolla is 5.5-6.5 mm long and blue. The pods are erect or slightly curved, compressed, 4–5 mm long with beak 2 mm. The seeds are small and elongated. It blossoms in April–May, the seeds ripen in May–June. It is self-pollinated.

== Use ==
Blue fenugreek is widely used in Georgian cuisine, where it is known as utskho suneli. It is one of the ingredients of the Georgian spice mix khmeli suneli. The seeds, the pods and the leaves are used. The smell and taste are similar to ordinary fenugreek, but milder. In Switzerland it is used for flavouring the traditional schabziger cheese.
