= Mexican marigold =

Mexican marigold also known as cempasúchil, or Aztec marigold is a native flower to México and was first used by the Aztecs and is used in the Mexican holiday "Día de muertos" or Day of the Dead. Day of the Dead originated from Aztec mythology to honor the Aztec goddess of death Mictēcacihuātl.

- Tagetes erecta
- Tagetes lemmonii
- Tagetes lucida
- Tagetes minuta
