= Khmeli suneli =

Georgian spice mix

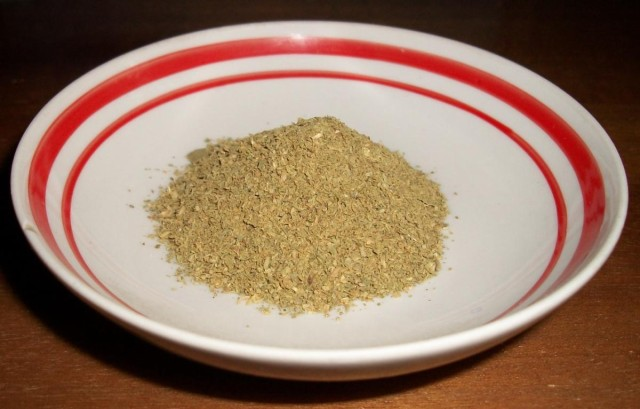
- Region or state: Georgia

Khmeli suneli (Georgian: ხმელი სუნელი, lit. 'dried spice') is a traditional Georgian spice mix. It typically contains ground coriander seed, celery seed, dried basil, dill, parsley, blue fenugreek (utskho suneli), summer savory, bay leaf, mint and marigold. There is no fixed recipe for khmeli suneli; in this respect it is similar to the Indian garam masala. Ready-made mixtures vary in color from pale green to golden to umber, with the best source of khmeli suneli being Svanetia.

This mixture is an ingredient of traditional Georgian dishes and sauces, such as kharcho. Khmeli suneli is also used as a seasoning for meat and for stews; author Darra Goldstein mentions spicy meatballs (abkhazura), cabbage with walnuts (kombostos ruleti nigvzit), and aubergine salad (badrijani mtsvanilit).

== Sources ==
- O'Connell, J. (2016). The Book of Spice: From Anise to Zedoary. Pegasus Books. ISBN 978-1-68177-192-2.
- Goldstein, D.; Pʻirosmanašvili, N. (2013). The Georgian Feast: The Vibrant Culture and Savory Food of the Republic of Georgia. University of California Press. ISBN 978-0-520-27591-1.
