= Nigvziani badrijani =

Georgian dish

- Place of origin: Georgia
- Serving temperature: cold
- Main ingredients: Eggplant, walnut paste

Nigvziani badrijani (Georgian: ნიგვზიანი ბადრიჯანი, romanized: nigvziani badrijani, lit. 'walnut eggplant') (Note: It may also be referred as Badrijani nigvzit.) is a Georgian dish made with fried eggplant stuffed with spiced walnut and garlic paste. It is often topped with pomegranate seeds.

== Preparation ==
Salted eggplants are sliced lengthwise, pressed to remove the bitter juice, left to rest. They are then fried in oil and refrigerated. The filling is prepared by blending walnuts, garlic, coriander, cayenne pepper, salt, fenugreek and vinegar with water in a food processor to give a puree, which is then seasoned. The fried eggplants and the stuffing are left to chill separately, and are assembled just a couple of hours before serving. To assemble, a layer of stuffing is placed on each piece of eggplant, which is then rolled up tightly. Badrijani can be garnished with red onions, coriander or pomegranate seed to serve.

== Ingredients ==
- 500 g eggplants
- 100 g ground walnuts
- 1 small white onion
- 2 small garlic cloves
- Handful coriander and parsley leaves
- 1/2 t ground coriander seed
- 1/2 t ground fenugreek seed
- 1/2 t ground marigold (tagetes)
- 1 pinch of cinnamon
- Salt and chili
- Sunflower seed oil
- Pomegranate seeds as garnish

== See also ==
- List of stuffed dishes
- Georgian cuisine
