= 2013 UK Music Video Awards =

- Date: 28 October 2013
- Location: Queen Elizabeth Hall, Southbank Centre, London
- Hosted by: Adam Buxton
- Website: www.ukmva.com

The 2013 UK Music Video Awards were held on 28 October 2013 at the Queen Elizabeth Hall in Southbank Centre, London and were hosted by Adam Buxton to recognise the best in music videos and music film making from United Kingdom and worldwide. The nominations were announced on 1 October 2013. American producer and rapper Flying Lotus won Video of the Year for "Until the Quiet Comes" directed by Kahlil Joseph. English director Julien Temple received the Icon Award. Below are the list of nominations, the winners are highlighted in bold.

== Video of the Year ==
Video of the Year
- **Flying Lotus – "Until the Quiet Comes"**
  **(Director: Kahlil Joseph)**

== The Icon Award ==
Icon Award
- **Julien Temple**

== Video Genre Categories ==
Best Pop Video - UK	Best Pop Video - International
**Willy Moon – "Yeah Yeah"** **(Director: Alex Courtès)**; Dizzee Rascal ft. Robbie Williams – "Goin' Crazy"; Elli Ingram – "Mad Love"; Jessie J ft. Big Sean & Dizzee Rascal – "Wild"; Josh Kumra – "Waiting For You"; Laura Mvula – "She"	**Solange Knowles – "Losing You"** **(Director: Melina Matsoukas)**; Frank Ocean – "Pyramids"; Justin Timberlake – "Mirrors"; Miley Cyrus – "We Can't Stop"; Robyn ft. Snoop Dogg – "U Should Know Better"; Toro y Moi – "Say That"
Best Dance Video - UK	Best Dance Video - International
**Rudimental ft. John Newman & Alex Clare – "Not Giving In"** **(Director: Josh Cole)**; Bonobo – "Cirrus"; Breach – "Jack"; Duke Dumont ft. A.M.E. – "Need U (100%)"; Rudimental – "Waiting All Night"; Zomby – "With Love"	**Gesaffelstein – "Pursuit"** **(Director: Fleur & Manu)**; Aviici vs Nicky Romero – "I Could Be The One"; C2C ft. Derek Martin – "Happy"; Fryars – "Cool Like Me"; Passion Pit – "Carried Away (Tiesto Remix)"; Vitalic – "Stamina"
Best Urban Video - UK	Best Urban Video - International
**Joel Compass – "Back to Me"** **(Director: Ian & Cooper)**; Dizzee Rascal – "Bassline Junkie"; Dizzee Rascal – "I Don't Need a Reason"; Iggy Azalea – "Work"; Mykki Blanco – "The Initiation"; Naughty Boy ft. Sam Smith – "La La La"	**2 Chainz ft. Kanye West – "Birthday Song"** **(Director: Andreas Nilsson)**; 2 Chainz ft. Pharrell – "Feds Watching"; Earl Sweatshirt – "Chum"; Killer Mike – "Reagan"; Macklemore & Ryan Lewis – "Can't Hold Us"; Macklemore & Ryan Lewis – "Thrift Shop"
Best Rock/Indie Video - UK	Best Rock/Indie Video - International
**Darwin Deez – "Free (The Editorial Me)"** **(Director: Ninian Doff)**; Bloc Party – "Ratchet"; Foals – "Late Night"; Is Tropical – "Dancing Anymore"; Tame Impala – "Mind Mischief"; The Civil Wars – "The One That Got Away"	**Yeah Yeah Yeahs – "Sacrilege"** **(Director: Megaforce)**; Cold Mailman – "My Recurring Dream"; Joey Ramone – "New York City"; Kodaline – "High Hopes"; Phoenix – "Trying to Be Cool"; Portugal. The Man – "Modern Jesus"
Best Alternative Video - UK	Best Alternative Video - International
**London Grammar – "Wasting My Young Years"** **(Director: Bison)**; Darwin Deez – "You Can't Be My Girl"; Florence + The Machine – "Lover to Lover"; James Blake – "Overgrown"; Jon Hopkins – "Open Eye Signal"; Raffertie – "Build Me Up"	**Flying Lotus – "Until the Quiet Comes"** **(Director: Kahlil Joseph)**; Biting Elbows – "Bad Motherfucker"; Flying Lotus – "Tiny Tortures"; Major Lazer – "Get Free"; M83 – "Wait"; Passion Pit – "Carried Away"
Best Pop Video - Budget	Best Dance Video - Budget
**Tiny Dancer – "Who Am I"** **(Director: Zaiba Jabbar)**; AlunaGeorge – "You Know You Like It"; Christian Helm – "Den Som Du Elsker"; Igor Volk – "Labyrinth"; OK Go – "I'm Not Through"; Society – "14 Hours"	**Pixel – "Call Me"** **(Director: Ola Martin Fjeld)**; Drums of Death ft. Yasmin – "True"; Hugo and the Prismatics – "Le Mystere"; Jimpster – "Roller Girl"; Let The Machines Do The Work – "Let Me Be The One"; Postino – "I Love It"
Best Urban Video - Budget	Best Rock/Indie Video - Budget
**Lushlife – "Magnolia"** **(Director: Lamar+Nik)**; ArtOfficial – "Blackbirds"; Azealia Banks – "Atlantis"; G Fresh – "Never Can I"; Ruckazoid – "Don't Let Me Go (She Ain't Mad at It)"; Thurz – "Colours"	**Kodaline – "All I Want"** **(Director: Stevie Russell)**; Half Moon Run – "Call Me in the Afternoon"; Hem – "Tourniquet"; NYPC – "Hard Knocks"; Pinkunoizu – "Moped"; Tunng – "The Village"
Best Alternative Video - Budget
**Connan Mockasin – "Faking Jazz Together"** **(Director: Fleur & Manu)**; John Grant – "GMF"; Mount Kimbie – "Home Recording"; Naïve New Beaters – "La Onda"; Tropics – "Home & Consonance"; We Show Up On Radar – "Hands Up If You're Lost"

== Technical ==
Best Animation in a Video	Best Art Direction & Design in a Video
**Hiatus ft. Shura – "We Can Be Ghosts Now"** **(Animator: Tom Jobbins)**; Bonobo – "Cirrus"; Joey Ramone – "New York City"; Is Tropical – "Dancing Anymore"; Shogu Tokumaru – "Katachi"; The Staves – "Winter Trees"	**Phoenix – "Trying to Be Cool"** **(Art Director: Laia Ateca)**; AlunaGeorge – "Your Drums, Your Love"; Björk – "Mutual Core"; Dizzee Rascal ft. Robbie Williams – "Goin' Crazy"; Gesaffelstein – "Pursuit"; Two Fingers – "Vengeance Rhythm"
Best Cinematography in a Video	Best Choreography in a Video
**Jon Hopkins – "Open Eye Signal"** **(DoP: Steve Annis)**; Florence + The Machine – "Lover to Lover"; Flying Lotus – "Until the Quiet Comes"; Ghostpoet – "Cold Win"; Sigur Rós – "Valtari"; Woodkid – "I Love You"	**Sigur Rós – "Valtari"** **(Choreographer: Sidi Larbi Cherkaoui)**; Atoms for Peace – "Ingenue"; C2C ft. Derek Martin – "Happy"; Laura Marling – "Master Hunter"; Stromae – "Papaoutai"; White Lies – "There Goes Our Love Again"
Best Editing in a Video	Best Styling in a Video
**Yeah Yeah Yeahs – "Sacrilege"** **(Editor: Sophie Fourdrinoy)**; Breach – "Jack"; Daughn Gibson – "Another Hell"; Jessie J ft. Big Sean & Dizzee Rascal – "Wild"; Major Lazer – "Get Free"; Rudimental – "Not Giving In"	**DJ Fresh vs Diplo ft. Dominique Young Unique – "Earthquake"** **(Stylist: Angela Esteban Librero)**; Gesaffelstein – "Pursuit"; Iggy Azalea – "Work"; Stromae – "Papaoutai"; Toro y Moi – "So Many Details"; Wiz Khalifa – "Remember You"
Best Colour Grade in a Video	Best Visual Effects in a Video
**Foals – "Late Night"** **(Colourist: Aubrey Woodiwiss)**; Bastille – "Things We Lost in the Fire"; How to Destroy Angels – "How Long"; James Blake – "Retrograde"; Jon Hopkins – "Open Eye Signal"; Lapalux – "Without You"	**Gesaffelstein – "Pursuit"** **(VFX Artist: Mathematic Paris)**; Björk – "Mutual Core"; Foals – "Bad Habit"; Flying Lotus – "Tiny Tortures"; London Grammar – "Wasting My Young Years"; Travis – "Moving"

== Special Production ==
Best Live Music Coverage	Best Music AD - TV or Online
**Led Zeppelin – "Celebration Day"** **(Director: Dick Carruthers)**; Mumford & Sons – "Road to Red Rocks"; Noel Gallagher’s High Flying Birds – "International Magic Live at The O2"; Plan B – "The Grindhouse Tour"; The Creators Project presents Savages Live; The Vaccines – "Bad Mood Live at The O2"	**Laura Mvula – "Sing to the Moon"** **(Director: Powster)**; Boards of Canada – "Cosecha Signal One"; Daft Punk – "Lotus F1"; Hurts – "Exile"; Olly Murs – "Right Time Right Place"; Naughty Boy – "Hotel Cabana"
Best Interactive Video	VEVO New Artist Award
**Do Not Touch – "Kilo by Light Light"** **(Director: Moniker)**; Beck – "Hello Again"; Moones – "Drunk in Session"; Sigur Rós – "Stormur"; Spoek – "Escape from '85"; The Family Rain – "Reason to Die Orbital"	**Naughty Boy ft. Sam Smith – "La La La"** **(Director: Ian Pons Jewell)**

== Individual ==
Best Producer	Best Commissioner
**Liz Kessler**; Amber Millington; Jules de Chateleux; Leanne Stott; Roman Pichon Herrera; Sarah Tognazzi	**Dan Curwin**; Caroline Clayton; James Hackett; John Moule; Mike O’Keefe; Sam Seager
Best Director	Best New Director
**Megaforce**; Andreas Nilsson; Fleur & Manu; Floria Sigismondi; Ian Pons-Jewell; Nabil	**Andrew Thomas Huang**; Becky & Joe; Brewer; Emile Sornin; Josh Cole; Young Replicant
