= What Went Down (disambiguation) =

What Went Down is a 2015 studio album by Foals.

What Went Down may also refer to:

- "What Went Down" (song), by Foals, 2015
- What Went Down (TV series), a 2014 American comedy series
