= Inhaler (Foals song) =

Single by Foals

from the album Holy Fire
- Released: 5 November 2012
- Recorded: 2012
- Genre: Dance-punk; indie rock; alternative rock
- Length: 4:54
- Label: Transgressive
- Songwriter(s): Foals (Jack Bevan, Walter Gervers, Yannis Philippakis, Jimmy Smith)
- Producer(s): Flood; Alan Moulder

Foals singles chronology
"Blue Blood" (2010)	"Inhaler" (2012)	"My Number" (2012)

"Inhaler" is a song by British band Foals. It is the lead single from their third album, Holy Fire. The track and music video were released on 5 November 2012 in the United Kingdom. The official video was directed by Foals' frequent collaborator Dave Ma and features artwork from Tinhead.

Inhaler won the award for best track of 2012 at the NME awards held in February 2013. The single was also the group's first chart appearance on any American singles chart, peaking at number 20 on the Billboard Alternative Songs chart in early 2013. Shortly after its peak on that chart, the song crossed over to hard rock radio and ultimately peaked at number 29 on the Billboard Hot Mainstream Rock Tracks chart.

== Track listing ==
Promo single
No.	Title	Length
1.	"Inhaler" (radio edit)	4:05
2.	"Inhaler"	4:54

== Chart positions ==
Chart (2013)	Peak position
Japan (Japan Hot 100)	62
Mexico Ingles Airplay (Billboard)	31
UK Singles (Official Charts Company)	110
US Alternative Airplay (Billboard)	20
US Mainstream Rock (Billboard)	29
US Rock Airplay (Billboard)	33
