= Yannis & The Yaw =

Musical project founded by Yannis Philippakis

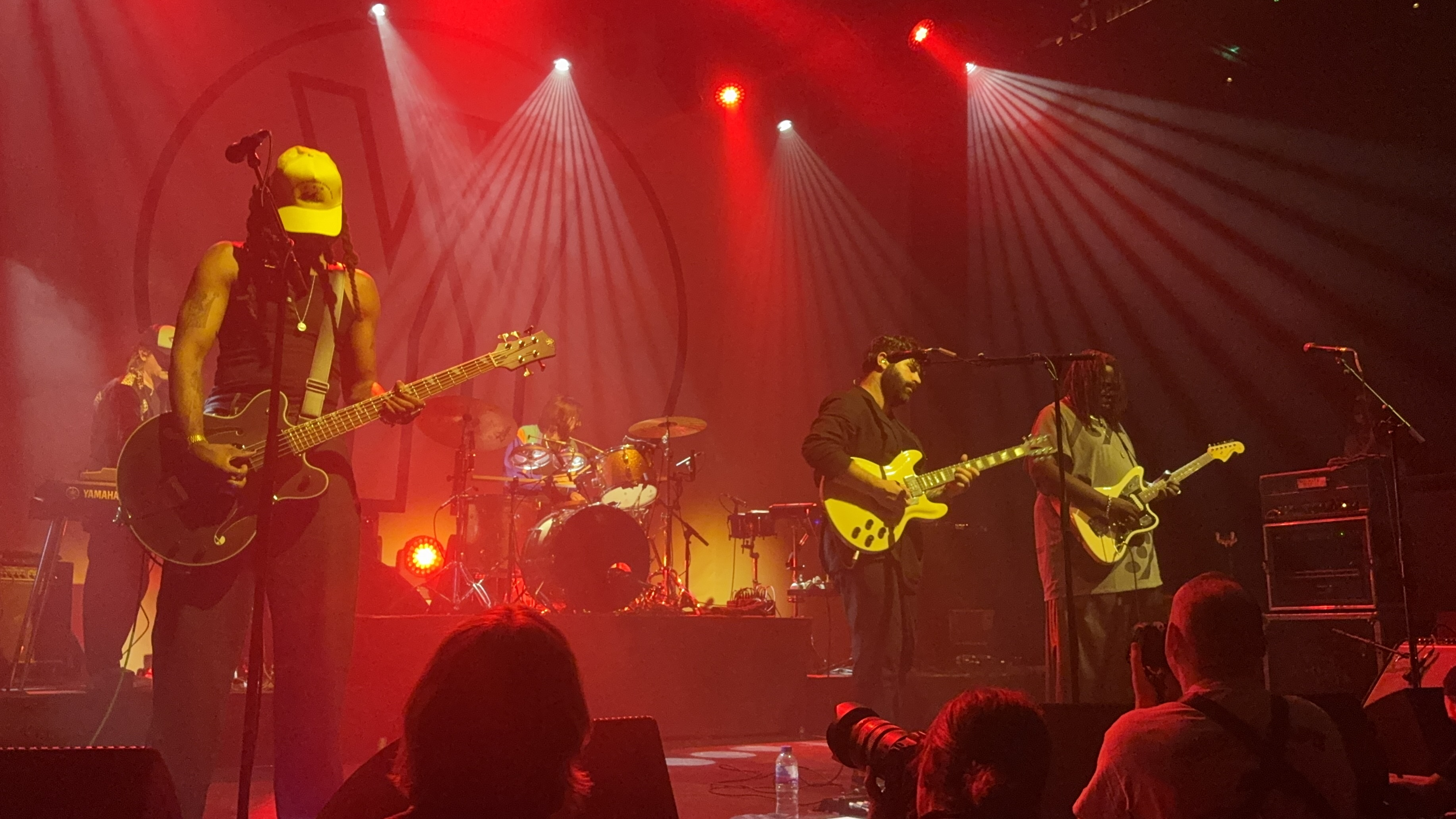
- Yannis & The Yaw performing at KOKO in September 2024. From left-to-right: Vincent Taurelle, Seye Adelekan, Vincent Taeger, Yannis Philippakis, Dave Okumu.

Background information
- Origin: Paris, France
- Genres: Afrobeat; funk
- Years active: 2016–present
- Label: Transgressive
- Members: Yannis Philippakis; Vincent Taeger; Vincent Taurelle
- Past members: Tony Allen; Ludovic Bruni
- Website: www.yannisandtheyaw.com

Yannis & The Yaw is the music project of Foals frontman Yannis Philippakis. It was formed in Paris in 2016. The project's debut EP, Lagos Paris London, was released on 30 August 2024.

The extended play was recorded with the late Afrobeat drummer Tony Allen over a two-day recording session at a Paris studio in 2016, and featured Allen's regular collaborators Vincent Taeger, Vincent Taurelle and Ludovic Bruni.

== History ==
=== Formation ===
In 2016, Foals frontman Yannis Philippakis met up with drummer Tony Allen for a two-day recording session at a "smoke-filled, '70s throwback" studio in Paris. Philippakis initially anticipated the pair would make an Afrobeat record, however, they developed a profound connection and recorded music stemming from the pairs' contrasting cultures featuring rock, funk, jazz and dub influences. They were joined by Allen's regular collaborators Vincent Taeger, Vincent Taurelle and Ludovic Bruni.

In an April 2024 interview with NME, Philippakis said "I feel unburdened now," about finally having the music with Allen completed. Philippakis continued: “There has been this unfinished business that has been occupying my vision for the future. I had to finish it. Especially after Tony passed away and in the midst of COVID; it became much more of a serious project. We had to try and do it justice. It feels good, and I just people to hear it and for it to be out".

=== Lagos Paris London ===
On 16 April 2024, the Yannis & The Yaw project was announced and "Walk Through Fire", the first single from Lagos Paris London, was released. A music video was recorded on 18 April 2024 at an interactive art installation in London featuring two actors depicting a young Philippakis and Allen, as well members of the public on 75 CRT televisions in a shopfront. Participants were given a cassette player with "Walk Through Fire" and were given the chance to make their own music video. Each television screen showcased different themes and ideas that inspired the project.

On 2 May 2024, the music video for "Walk Through Fire" was released and three shows in Amsterdam, Paris and London were announced for September 2024. Two in-store signing events at Truck Store in Oxford and Rough Trade East in London were later announced.

On 7 June 2024, the second single from Lagos Paris London, "Under The Strikes", was released. Max Pilley of NME described the track as "a thrilling blend of highlife rhythms and a cascading brass section, with Philippakis’ high-pitched vocals dancing in the top of the mix". Frontman Yannis Philippakis said that the song was "inspired by walking to the studio during Paris’s refuse strikes, where trash was piled three stories high".

On 23 July 2024, the third and final single from the EP, "Rain Can't Reach Us", was released. The track's music video was made using a technique called AI Stop Motion developed by Philippakis and touring musician, filmmaker and regular Foals collaborator Kit Monteith which "involves the individual manipulation of every single frame, of which there are 25 per second" according to Monteith.

Lagos Paris London was released on 30 August 2024 to widespread critical acclaim. Reviewers praised the project's blend of Afrobeat and indie and Philippakis' powerful vocals. Robin Murry of Clash rated it 8 out of 10, stating, "Lagos Paris London is evidence of how much blood, sweat and tears went into the making of the record, but also of how well-connected Yannis and Tony Allen felt while working together. The result defies expectations in the best possible way."

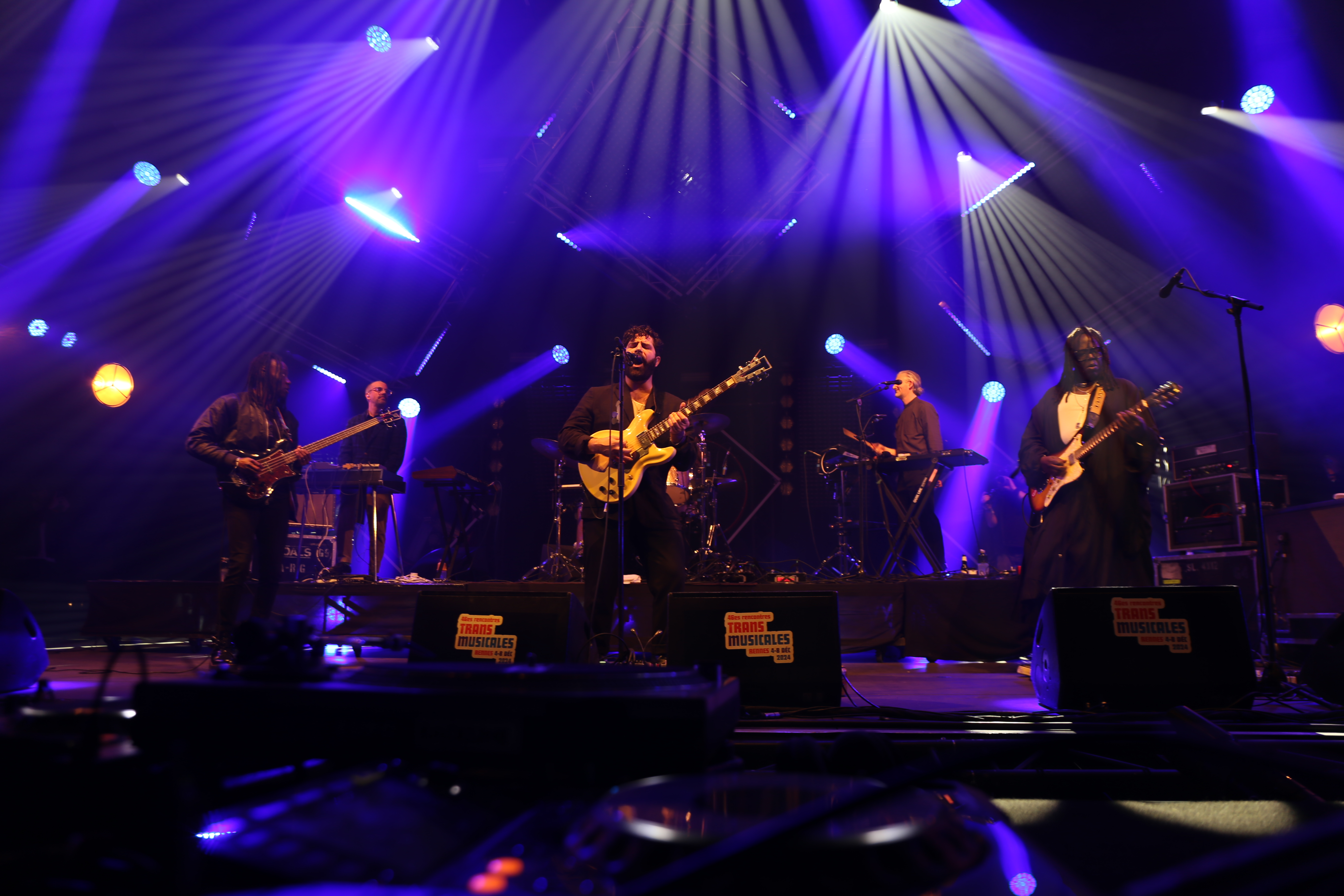
Yannis & The Yaw at Trans Musicales 2024

In October 2024, further live shows in Rennes, Manchester, Bristol, and London were announced for December that same year. The Manchester show at New Century Hall on 9 December was cancelled on the day of the concert due to water issues in the city centre following a burst pipe a few days before.

== Band members ==
- Yannis Philippakis – lead vocals, guitar (2016–present)
- Vincent Taeger – drums (2016–present)
- Vincent Taurelle – keys (2016–present)

Former members

- Tony Allen – drums (2016)
- Ludovic Bruni – bass, guitar (2016)

Touring members

- Dave Okumu – guitar (2024–present)
- Seye Adelekan – bass (2024–present)
- Kit Monteith – percussion (2024–present)
