= My Number (Foals song) =

Single by Foals

from the album Holy Fire
- Released: 17 December 2012
- Recorded: 2012
- Genre: Rock; funk rock
- Length: 4:03
- Label: Transgressive
- Songwriter(s): Jack Bevan; Walter Gervers; Yannis Philippakis; Jimmy Smith
- Producer(s): Flood; Alan Moulder

Foals singles chronology
"Inhaler" (2012)	"My Number" (2012)	"Late Night" (2013)

"My Number" is a song by British rock band Foals, released as the second single from their third studio album Holy Fire. The song debuted live on 13 November 2012 during the band's performance on Later... with Jools Holland. A month later to the date, they debuted the album version on Zane Lowe's BBC Radio 1 show on 13 December, then posted it via their YouTube page later the same day. A few days later, the single was released digitally in Australia on 17 December 2012. The music video premiered on 23 January 2013.

The song reached number 23 in the UK Singles Chart to become their highest charting single to date. It is also the band's most successful single to date worldwide.

The single artwork is by Leif Podhajsky.

== Track listing ==
UK two-track promo CD
No.	Title	Length
1.	"My Number" (radio edit)
2.	"My Number" (album version)

7" single
No.	Title	Length
1.	"My Number"
2.	"My Number" (Totally Enormous Extinct Dinosaurs remix)

Record Store Day 7"
No.	Title	Length
1.	"My Number"
2.	"Bluebird"

Holy Fire Record Store Day – Gold coloured bonus 7"
No.	Title	Length
1.	"My Number (Friendly Fires remix – edit)"
2.	"Bluebird"

== Charts ==
Chart (2013)	Peak position
Australia (ARIA)	98
Belgium (Ultratop 50 Flanders)	45
Belgium (Ultratip Bubbling Under Wallonia)	35
France (SNEP)	38
Ireland (IRMA)	51
Mexico Ingles Airplay (Billboard)	29
Netherlands (Single Top 100)	83
Scotland (OCC)	25
Switzerland Airplay (Schweizer Hitparade)	34
UK Singles (OCC)	23
US Rock & Alternative Airplay (Billboard)	48
US Alternative Airplay (Billboard)	20
Venezuela Pop/Rock General (Record Report)	32

== Certifications ==
Region	Certification	Certified units/sales
New Zealand (RMNZ)	Gold	15,000^{‡}
United Kingdom (BPI)	2× Platinum	1,200,000^{‡}
^{‡} Sales+streaming figures based on certification alone.

== Appearances in media ==
The song is used in ITV's UEFA Champions League: Extra Time programme when displaying group standings. The song was used prominently by the BBC during their coverage of the 2013 Six Nations rugby tournament. It also featured as the theme music for the BBC's coverage of the Glastonbury Festival 2013. The song also featured in series 2 episode 2 of BBC One drama Doctor Foster in September 2017. It also featured in EA Sports game, FIFA 14, in the form of an exclusive mix dubbed "Trophy Wife remix". It was also featured on Grey's Anatomy in 2013 during Season 9.
