= What Went Down (song) =

2015 single by Foals

Single by Foals

from the album What Went Down
- B-side: "What Went Down" (radio edit)
- Released: 16 June 2015
- Recorded: 2014–2015
- Studio: La Fabrique (Saint-Rémy-de-Provence, France)
- Genre: Alternative rock; hard rock
- Length: 5:00
- Label: Warner Bros.; Transgressive
- Songwriters: Yannis Philippakis; Jack Bevan; Jimmy Smith; Walter Gervers
- Producer: James Ford

Foals singles chronology
"Out of the Woods" (2013)	"What Went Down" (2015)	"Mountain at My Gates" (2015)

Music video
- "What Went Down" on YouTube

"What Went Down" is a single by the British rock band Foals. It is the title track from their fourth studio album of the same name and was debuted and released as its lead single on 16 June 2015 via DJ Annie Mac's BBC Radio 1 show.

== Track listing ==
CD-R Promo
No.	Title	Length
1.	"What Went Down" (Album version)	5:00
2.	"What Went Down" (Radio edit)	4:01
3.	"What Went Down" (Instrumental version)	4:58
Total length:		13:59

Digital version
No.	Title	Length
1.	"What Went Down" (Album version)	5:00
2.	"What Went Down" (Radio edit)	4:01
Total length:		9:01

Streaming version
No.	Title	Length
1.	"What Went Down"	5:00
Total length:		5:00

== Charts ==
Chart (2015)	Peak position
Czech Republic Modern Rock (IFPI)	1
Mexico Ingles Airplay (Billboard)	30
UK Singles (Official Charts)	172
US Alternative Airplay (Billboard)	24
US Mainstream Rock (Billboard)	35

== Certifications ==
Certifications for What Went Down
Region	Certification	Certified units/sales
United Kingdom (BPI)	Silver	200,000^{‡}
^{‡} Sales+streaming figures based on certification alone.

== Bandwidth remix ==
"What Went Down (Bandwidth Remix)"

Remix by Foals featuring Justin Chancellor and The Crystal Method
- Released: 15 September 2016
- Genre: Electronic rock
- Length: 5:10
- Label: Warner Bros. UK
- Songwriters: Yannis Philippakis; Jack Bevan; Jimmy Smith; Walter Gervers
- Producers: James Ford; Justin Chancellor; Scott Kirkland

The Crystal Method singles chronology
"Over It" (2015)	"What Went Down (Bandwidth Remix)" (2016)	"Going In" (2016)

Music video
- "What Went Down (Remix)" on YouTube

On 16 September 2015, a remix of "What Went Down" was released featuring remixing from Justin Chancellor (Tool) and Scott Kirkland of The Crystal Method. The single was released for streaming and digital download.
