= Olympos, Karpathos =

Olympos Όλυμπος
- Municipal unit
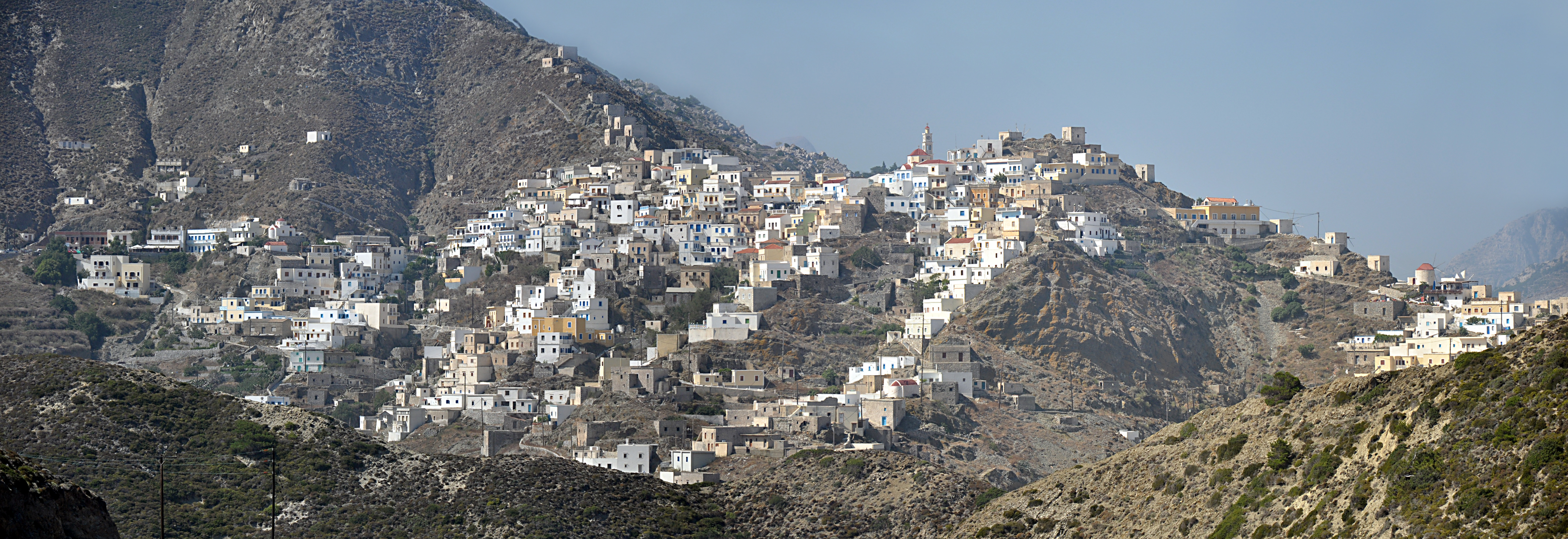

- Location within Karpathos

- Location within Greece
- Coordinates: 35°44′N 27°11′E
- Country: Greece
- Administrative region: South Aegean
- Regional unit: Karpathos-Kasos
- Municipality: Karpathos

Area
  - Municipal unit: 104.9 km^{2} (40.5 sq mi)

Population (2021)
  - Municipal unit: 530
  - Municipal unit density: 5.1/km^{2} (13/sq mi)
- Time zone: UTC+2 (EET)
  - Summer (DST): UTC+3 (EEST)

Olympos (Greek: Όλυμπος) is a village and a former self-governing community on the island of Karpathos, in the Dodecanese, Greece. Since the 2011 local government reform it is part of the municipality Karpathos, of which it is a municipal unit. It is located in the northern part of the island. The total land area of the community is 104.876 km^{2}.

== History ==
In antiquity in this place there was the Doric city Vrykous or Vrycous. Vrykous was one of the three ancient cities of Karpathos. It was located near the village Avlona. Today a small part of the city and the walls are preserved as well as some ruins from graves and three old Christian churches. Olympos was named after the mountain where it is built. The name of the village is feminine (Η Όλυμπος/I Olympos) contrary to the name of the mountain that is masculine (Ό Όλυμπος/O Olympos). The name Elympos (Έλυμπος) is used, mainly by local villagers. The villagers of Olympos kept the local dialect and the traditional costume due to the isolation of this place from the rest of Karpathos. The traditional style of the village attracts many tourists nowadays.

=== Historical population ===
Census	Settlement	Community
1991	304	
2001	323	480
2011	270	556
2021	200	530

== Notable people ==
- Yannis Philippakis, frontman of the British indie band Foals

== Photo gallery ==
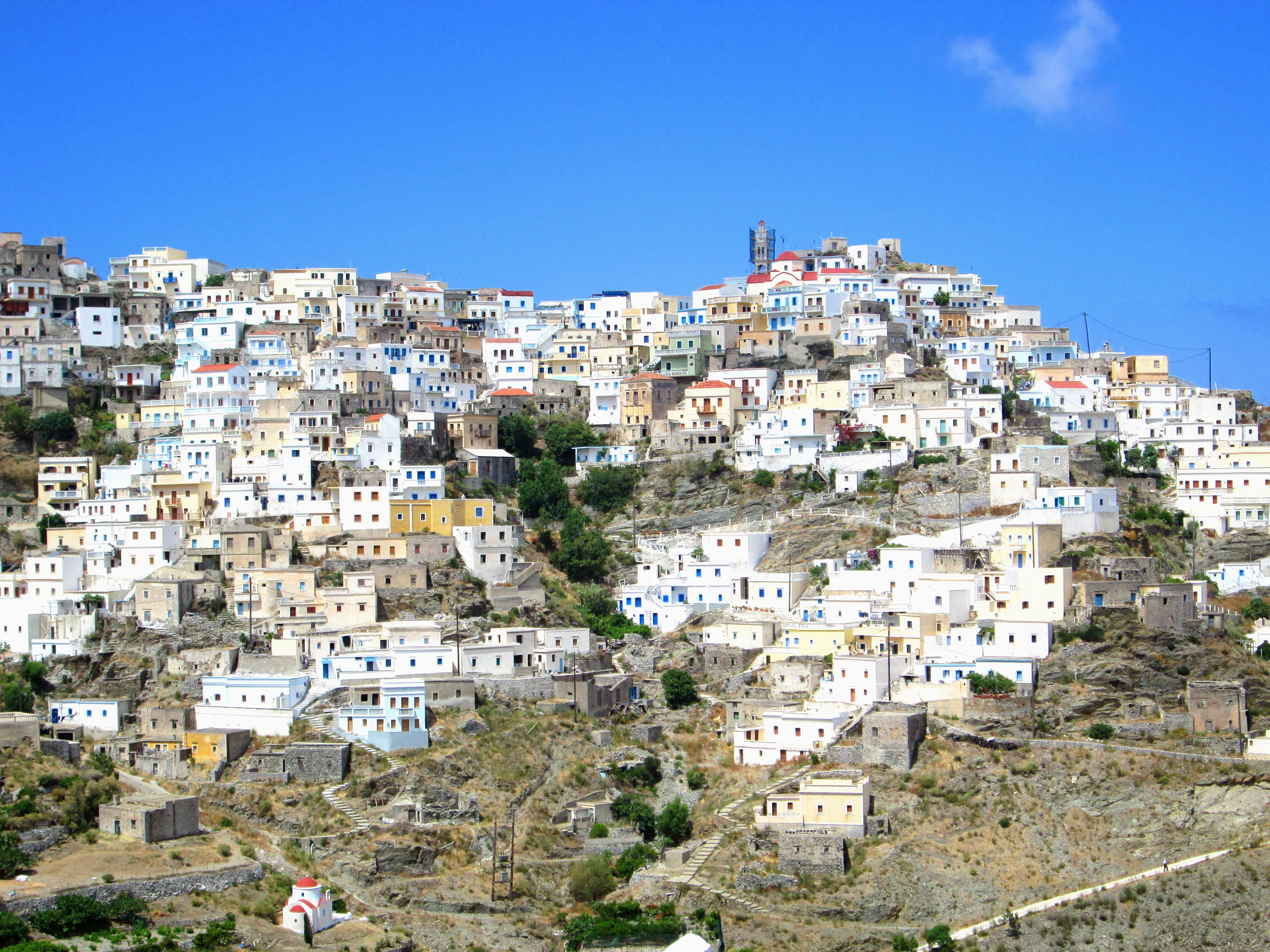
Closer view of the village

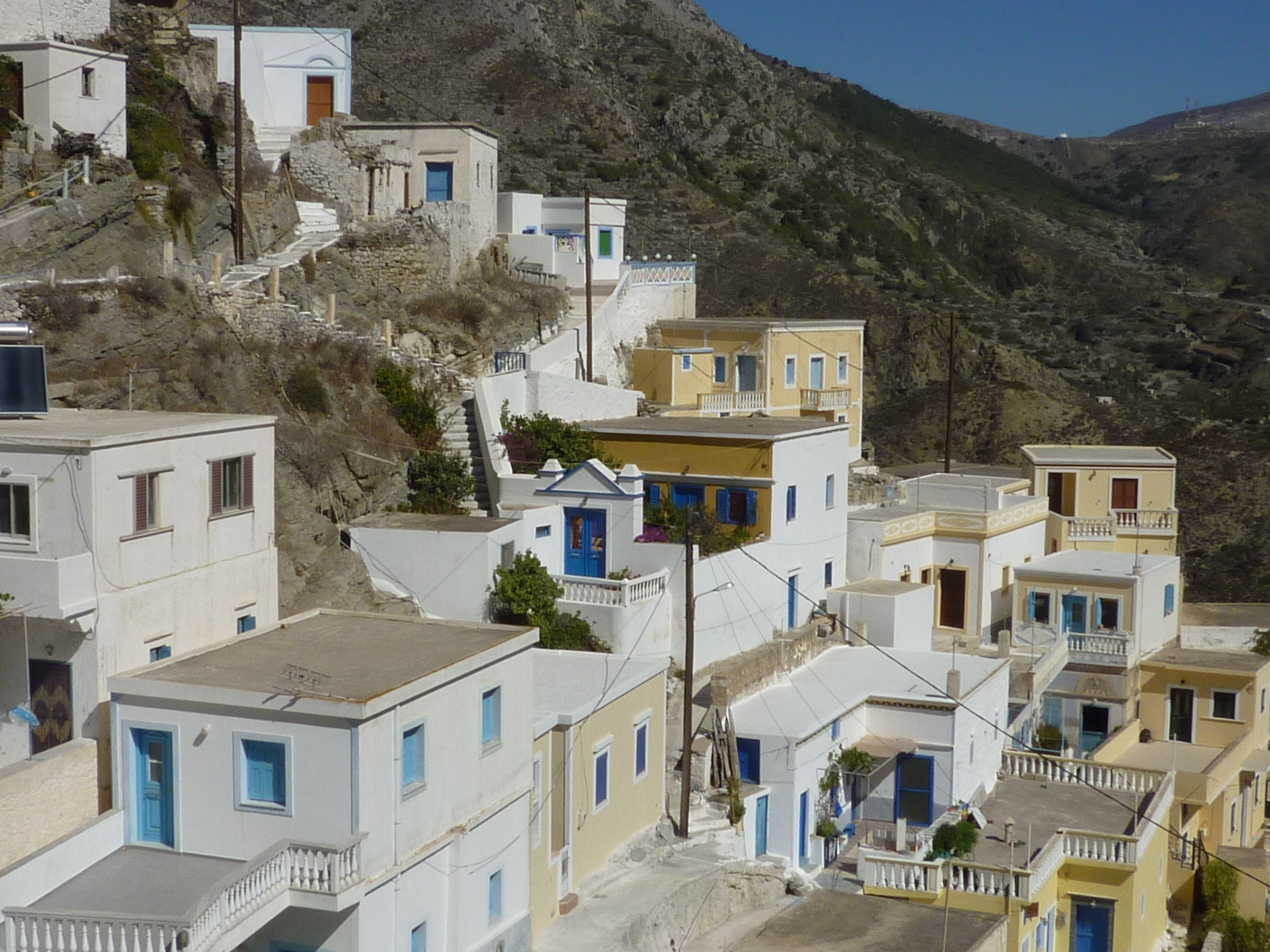
Houses

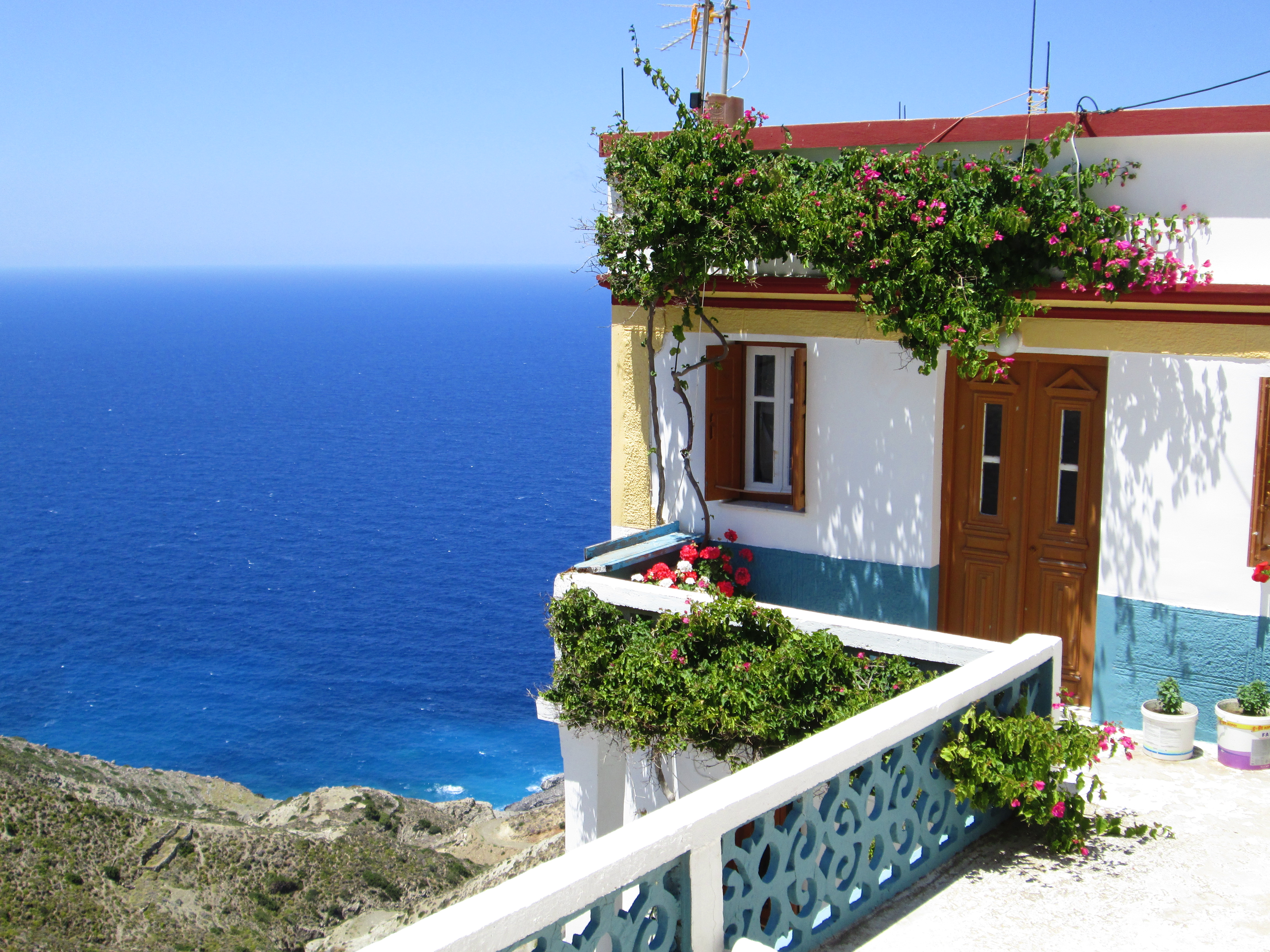
Balcony with view to the ocean

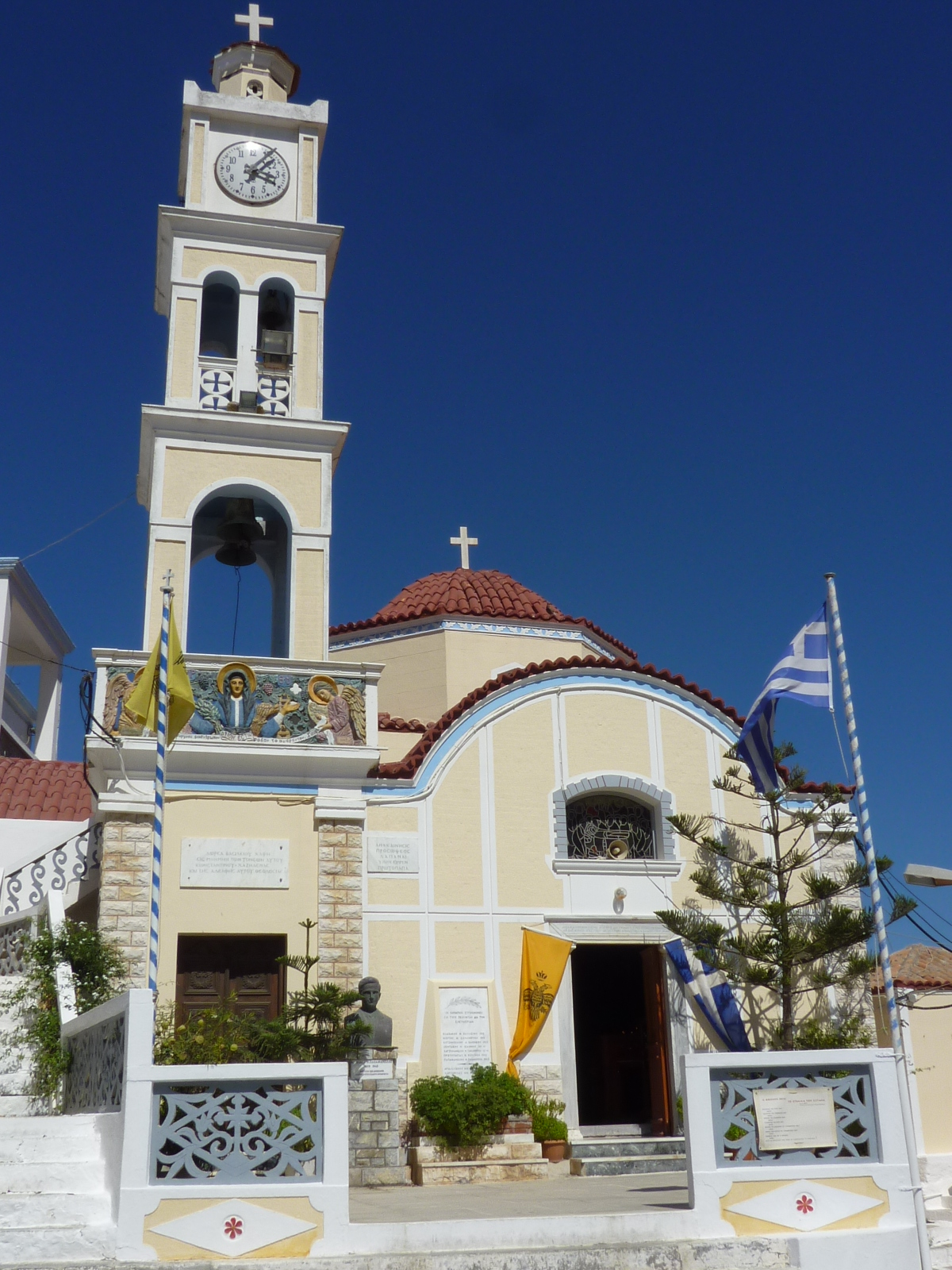
Local church

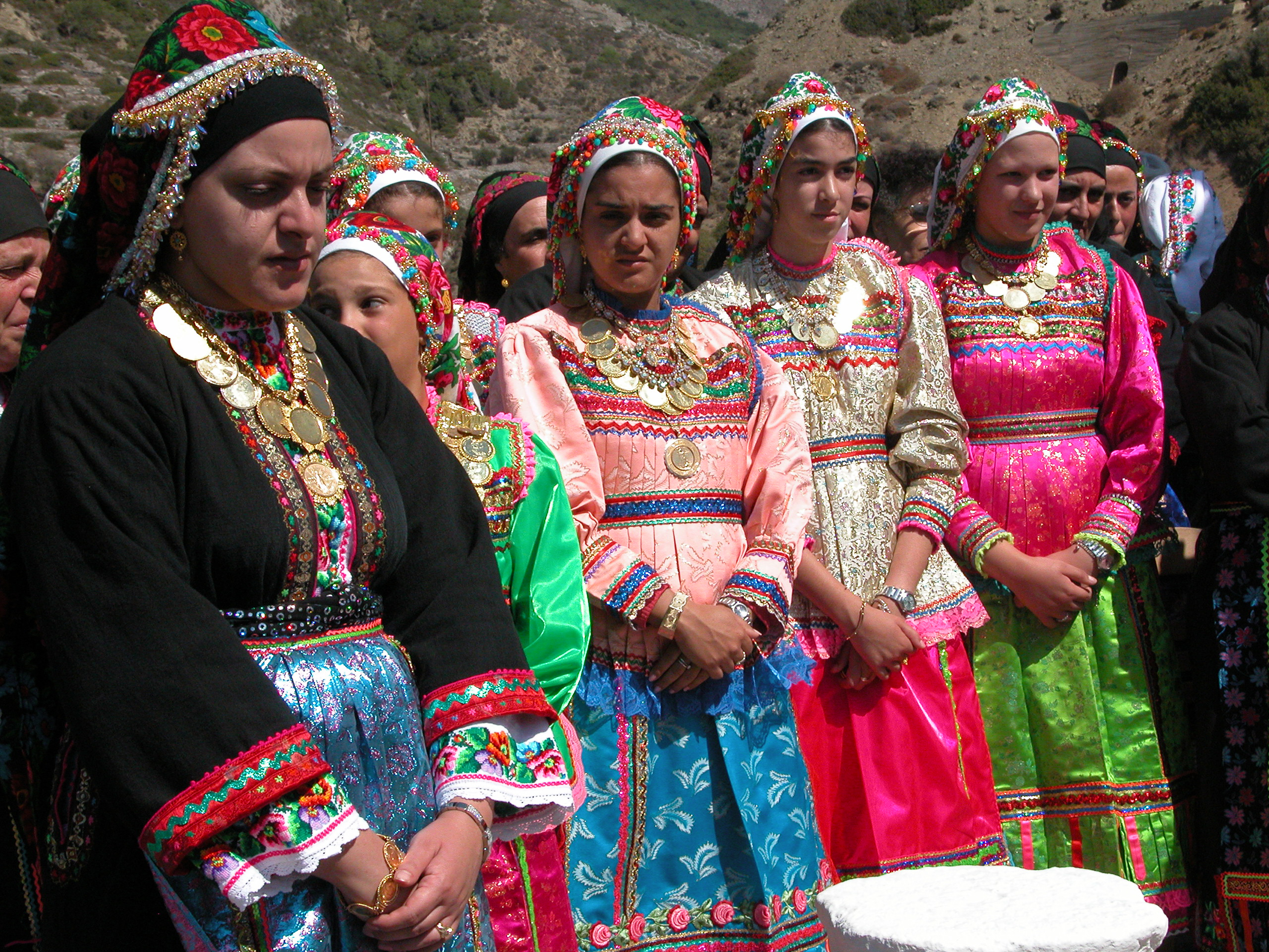
Local women dressed for a festival of Mary, mother of Jesus

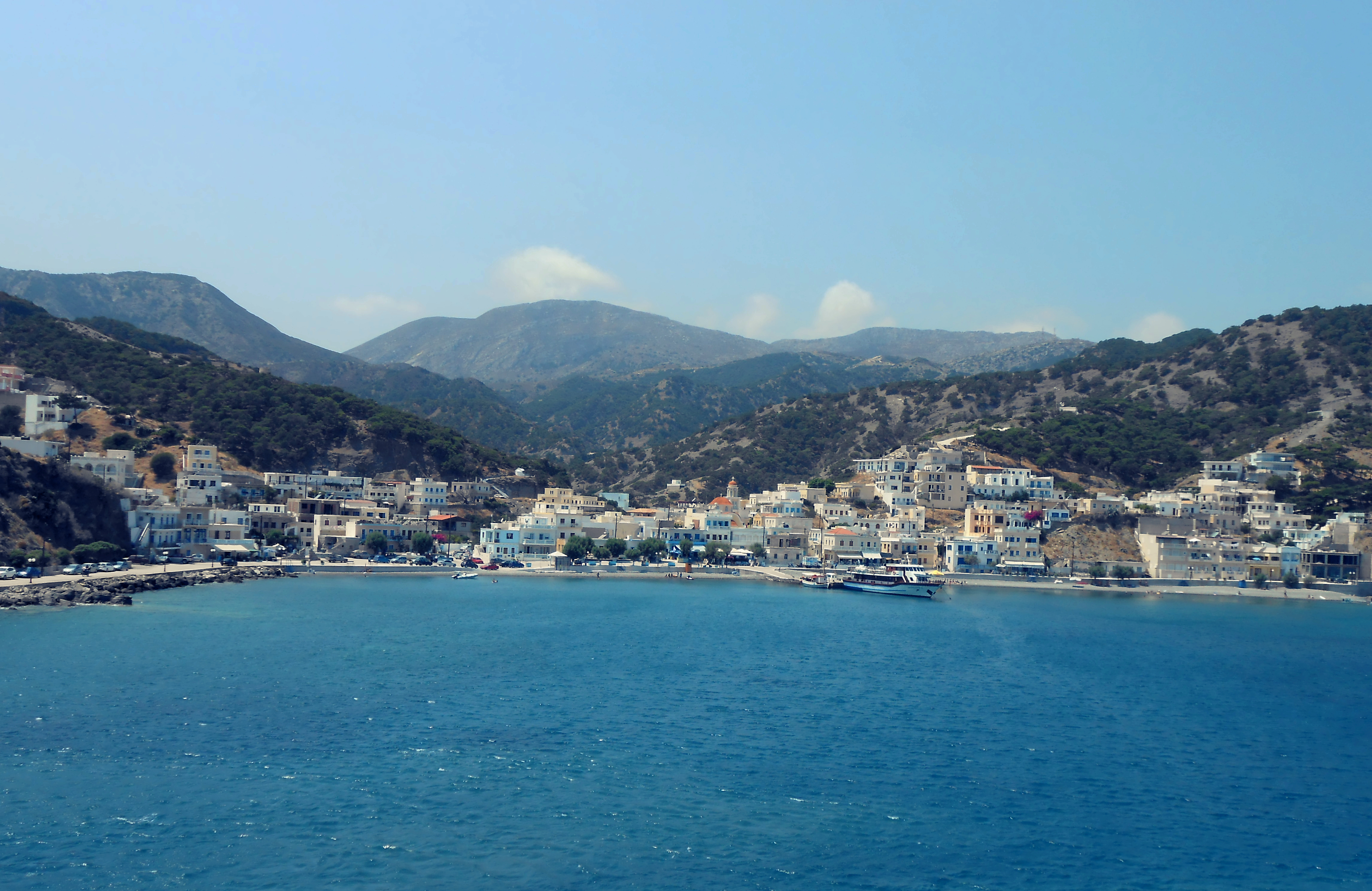
Diafani village, seaport of Olympos traditional village

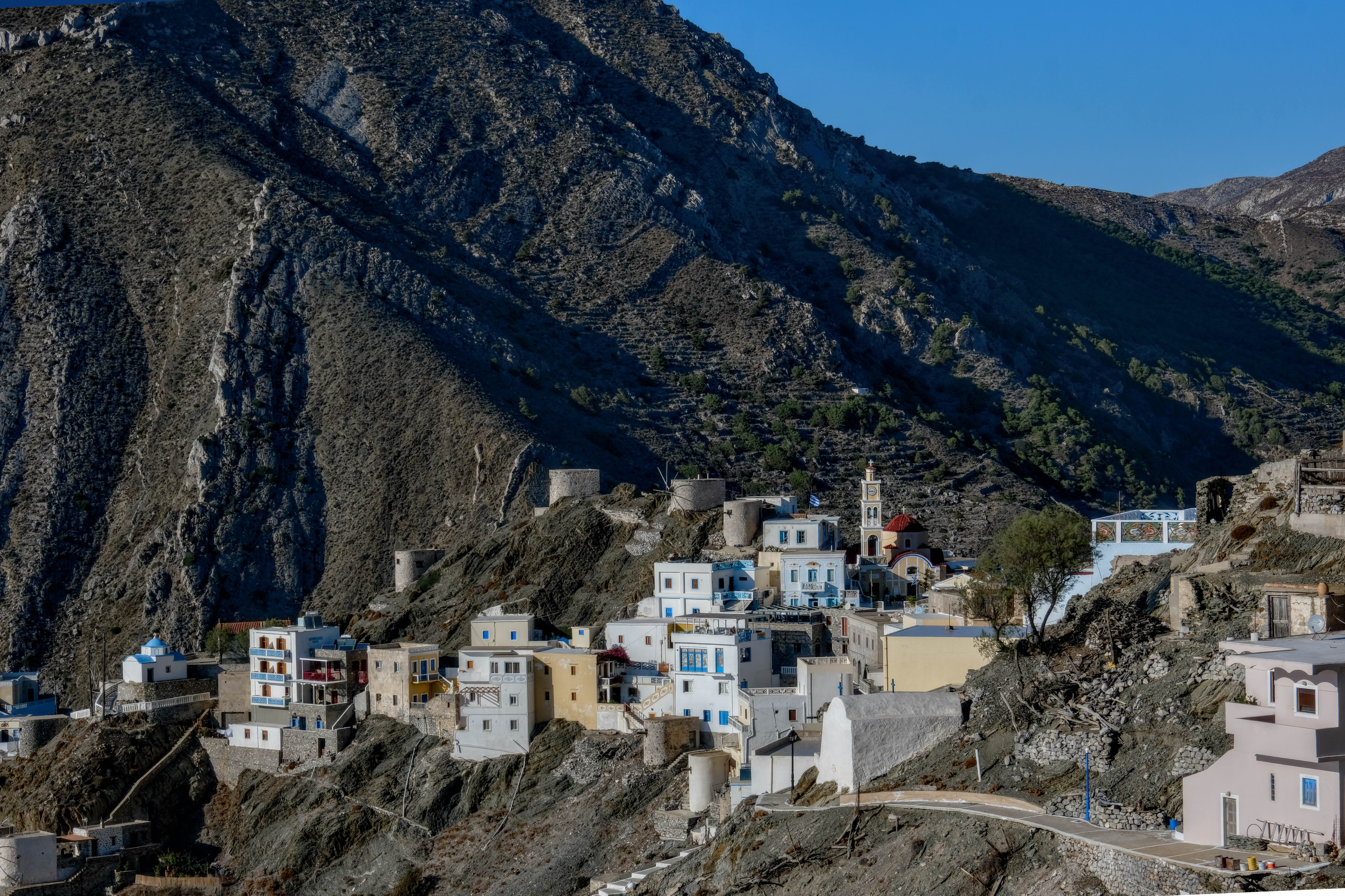
Olympos seaside from a distance

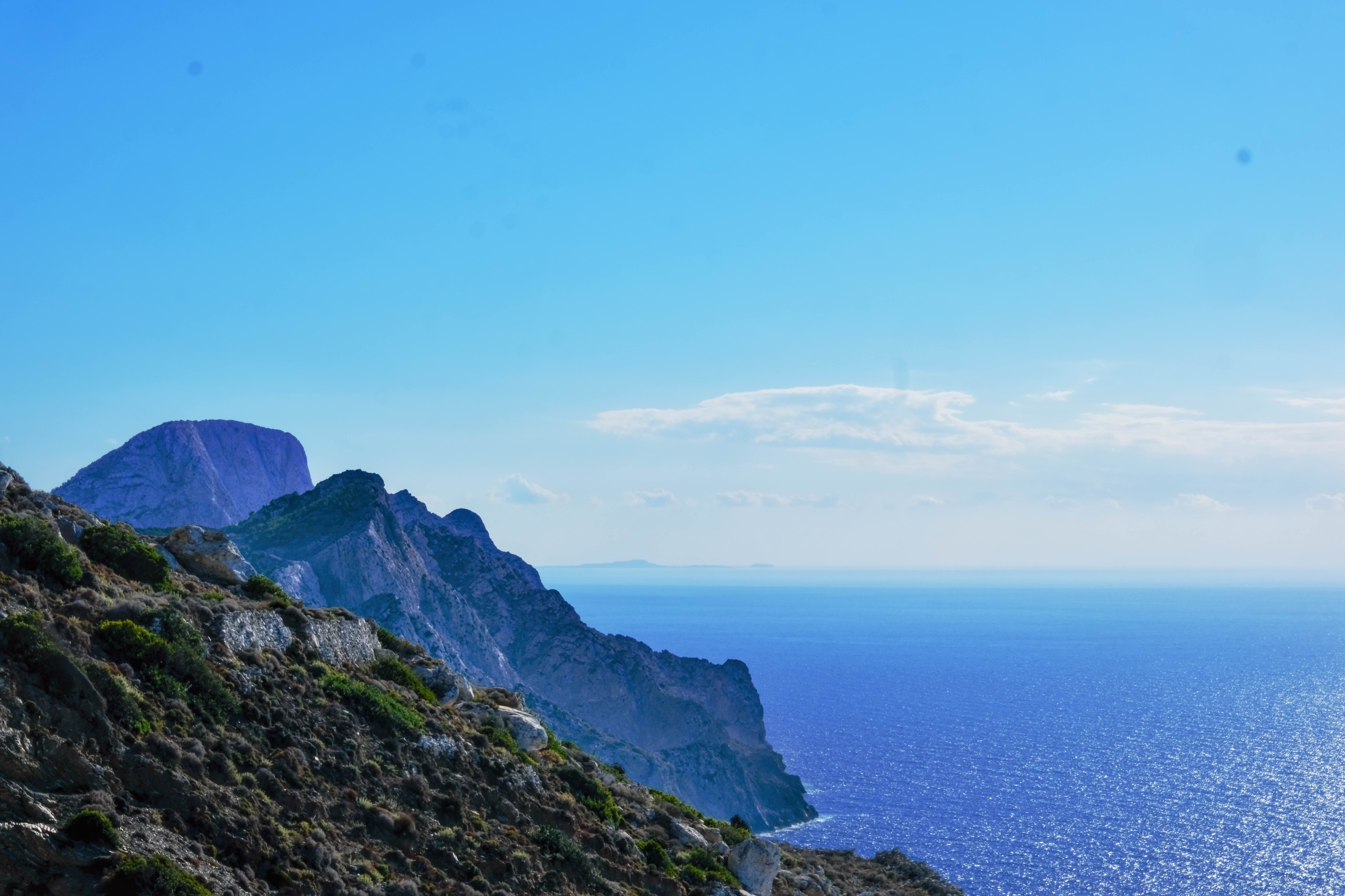
Mountains around Olympos
