= Mountain at My Gates =

Single by Foals

from the album What Went Down
- Released: 21 July 2015
- Recorded: 2014–2015
- Studio: La Fabrique Studios (Saint-Rémy-de-Provence, France)
- Genre: Indie rock; post-punk revival
- Length: 4:02
- Label: Transgressive; Warner Bros.
- Songwriter: Foals
- Producer: James Ford

Foals singles chronology
"What Went Down" (2015)	"Mountain at My Gates" (2015)	"Give It All" (2015)

Music video
- "Mountain at My Gates" on YouTube

"Mountain at My Gates" is a song by British rock band Foals. It was released as the second single from their fourth studio album, What Went Down, on 21 July 2015. The song peaked at number one on the US Billboard Alternative Songs chart, number 35 on the Belgian Flanders Tip Singles Chart, number 87 on the UK Singles Chart, and number 192 on the French Singles Chart. The song was also featured in the soundtrack for the video game FIFA 16 and appeared in the Blizzard Mountain expansion trailer of Forza Horizon 3.

== Music video ==
The official music video, lasting four minutes and eleven seconds, was uploaded to the official Foals YouTube channel on 29 July 2015. It is a spherical video taken in 4K quality with a GoPro and filmed at the Alexandra Road Estate. A non-spherical version of the video is also available for viewing.

== Track listing ==
Digital download
No.	Title	Length
1.	"Mountain at My Gates"	4:02

== Charts ==
=== Weekly charts ===
Chart (2015–16)	Peak position
Australia Hitseekers (ARIA)	8
Belgium (Ultratip Bubbling Under Flanders)	35
Canada Rock (Billboard)	7
Finland Airplay (Radiosoittolista)	94
France (SNEP)	192
Mexico Ingles Airplay (Billboard)	48
Poland (LP3)	51
UK Singles (OCC)	87
US Hot Rock & Alternative Songs (Billboard)	20
US Rock & Alternative Airplay (Billboard)	4
US Adult Alternative Airplay (Billboard)	9
US Alternative Airplay (Billboard)	1
US Mainstream Rock (Billboard)	17

Chart (2024)	Peak position
Australia Digital Tracks (ARIA)	42

=== Year-end charts ===
Chart (2016)	Position
US Adult Alternative Songs (Billboard)	30
US Alternative Songs (Billboard)	17
US Hot Rock Songs (Billboard)	48
US Rock Airplay Songs (Billboard)	19

== Certifications ==
Region	Certification	Certified units/sales
New Zealand (RMNZ)	Platinum	30,000^{‡}
United Kingdom (BPI)	Platinum	600,000^{‡}
United States (RIAA)	Gold	500,000^{‡}
^{‡} Sales+streaming figures based on certification alone.

== Release history ==
Region	Date	Format	Label
Worldwide	21 July 2015	Digital download	Transgressive; Warner Bros.
