= Hypercolour (song) =

Single by British DJ producing duo

Single by CamelPhat featuring Yannis Philippakis and Foals

from the album Dark Matter
- Released: 26 June 2020
- Recorded: Liverpool, London
- Genre: Dance, electronic
- Length: 3:29
- Label: RCA Records; Sony Music Entertainment
- Songwriter(s): Dave Whelan; Mike Di Scala; Yannis Philippakis
- Producer(s): Dave Whelan; Mike Di Scala; Yannis Philippakis

"Hypercolour" is a song produced by Liverpool DJ duo CamelPhat featuring British indie rock band Foals and front man Yannis Philippakis and marks the first song Philippakis features on as a solo under the name 'Yannis'.

The song title refers to the word used to describe how certain fabric dyes change colour when exposed to different temperatures.

CamelPhat had previous stated that they had been 'longtime fans of Foals' who had been on their 'list to collaborate with' with "Hypercolour" being the result of sessions set in Liverpool and London.

== Initial release ==
The song was first released as a single, then appeared on CamelPhat's Dark Matter album in October later that year.

The official visualizer was released on CamelPhat's YouTube channel a month after the song's initial release and the music official video was released on CamelPhat's YouTube channel was released the following August.

== Official visualizer ==
The official visualizer was released on July 17, 2020 on the duo's YouTube Channel. The video was directed by Philippakis and Kit Moneith.

The video itself features Philippakis frequently in a range of different backgrounds that grow increasingly 'kaleidoscopic' with the beat of the track.

== Official music video ==
The official music video was uploaded on the 20th of August once again on the duo's YouTube. The video is directed by French Director Max Vatblé and produced by the company Mynd and shot and edited in time-lapse.

The video follows a young man on a holiday island in an array of time-lapsed shots of his 'hypersaturated' journey. The video is reminiscent of a psychedelic 'trip' with Director of Photography Robin Asselmeyer using unconventional angles and hypnotic lights to emphasize the 'psychedelic mindset' both the video and the music encapsulate. The video was shot in Martigues, France.
