= Avlona, Karpathos =

Village in Karpathos, Greece

Coordinates: 35°46′N 27°11′E

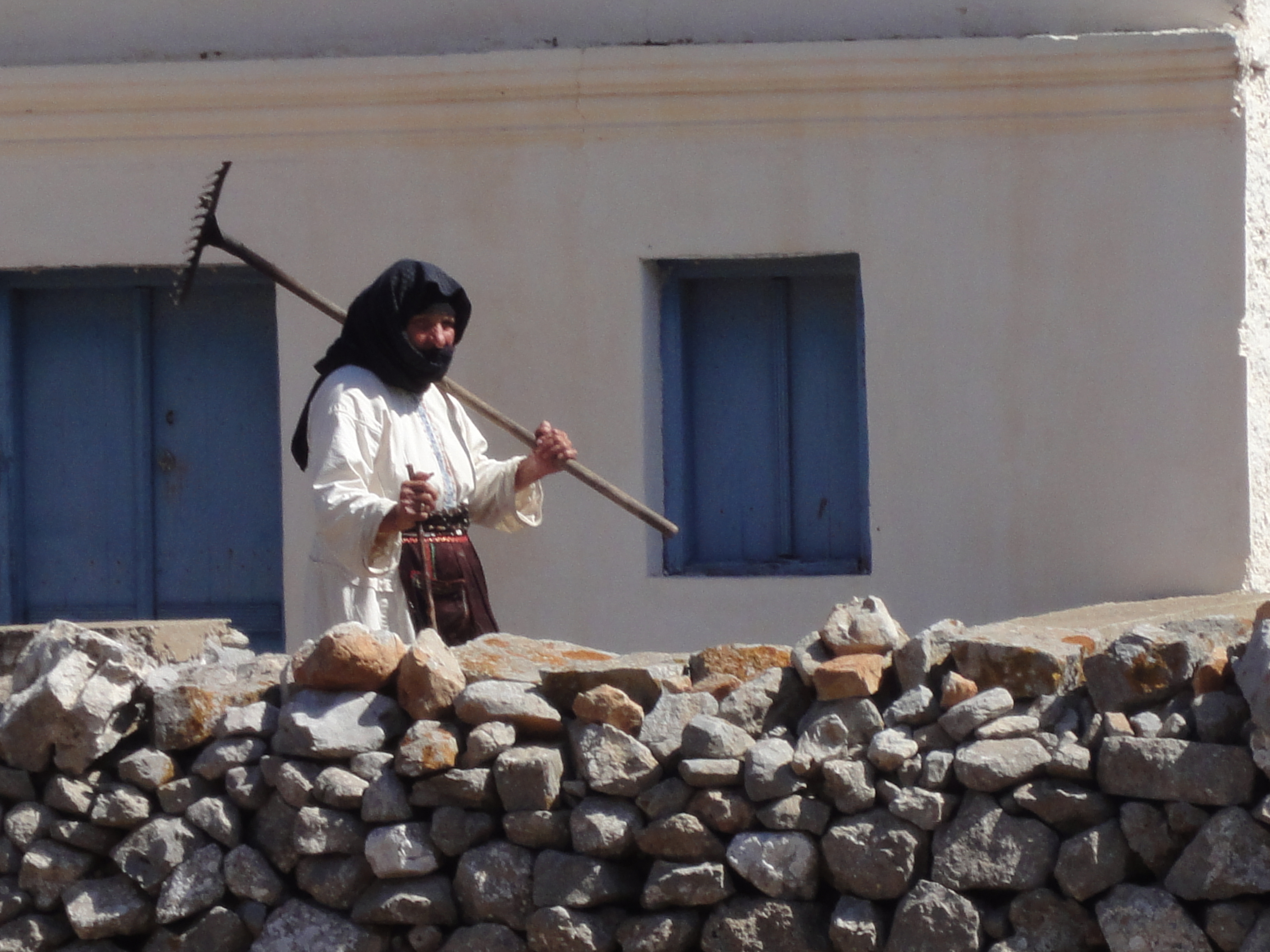
Karpathos Villager

Avlona (Greek: Αυλώνα) is a small village (pop. 6 in 2011) in Greece, on the island Karpathos, which is one of the Dodecanese islands. It is part of the community of Olympos. It is located in a fertile valley between Mount Oros and Mount Steoe.

== Location ==
Avlona is currently the northernmost village in Karpathos that is accessible by automobile, and is accessible only via Olympos or Diafani. At the end of the Avlona road, there are hiking trails which lead to the ancient coastal settlement of Vrykountas, as well as the next village to the north, Tristomo (which is currently only accessible either by foot via Avlona or Diafani, or by boat via Diafani).

As of March 2019, there is a paved road being constructed to connect Avlona to Tristomo, which will officially connect all the villages of Karpathos.
