= Mogoya =

Studio album by Oumou Sangaré
- Released: 19 May 2017
- Length: 41:40
- Label: No Format!

Oumou Sangaré chronology
Seya (2009)	Mogoya (2017)

Professional ratings
Aggregate scores
Source	Rating
Metacritic	86/100
Review scores
Source	Rating
Robert Christgau	B+
The Guardian	4/5 stars
Mojo	4/5 stars
PopMatters	9/10

Mogoya is the fifth studio album by Maliian singer-songwriter Oumou Sangaré. It was released on 19 May 2017.

== Critical reception ==
Mojo wrote that "musically, the key track here may be 'Kamelemba,' with keyboard washes beneath the hunter’s harp, the kamele n'goni, and subtle phasing added."

== Track listing ==
No.	Title	Length
1.	"Bena Bena"	4:55
2.	"Yere Faga" (featuring Tony Allen, Ludovic Bruni, Vincent Taeger, Vincent Taurelle)	5:11
3.	"Fadjamou" (featuring Tony Allen)	4:35
4.	"Mali Niale"	5:17
5.	"Kamelemba" (featuring Ludovic Bruni, Vincent Taeger, Vincent Taurelle)	4:13
6.	"Djoukourou" (featuring Ludovic Bruni, Vincent Taeger, Vincent Taurelle)	4:09
7.	"Kounkoun" (featuring Ludovic Bruni, Vincent Taeger, Vincent Taurelle)	4:46
8.	"Minata Waraba"	5:02
9.	"Mogoya"	3:32

== Charts ==
Chart	Peak position
Belgian Albums (Ultratop Wallonia)	195
Dutch Albums (Album Top 100)	71
US World Albums (Billboard)	15
