= Ludovic Bruni =

French musician

Ludovic Bruni (born 1976 in Hyères, France) is a French guitarist, bassist and music producer.

== Biography ==
After joining Francois Jeanneau's improvisation class at the Paris National Conservatory in 1998, he entered the Parisian music scene and gained experience in different musical styles.

In 1999, Bruni met Fred Pallem and joined the Troupe du Phénix as well as Le Sacre du Tympan (with whom he won the prestigious Victoire de la Musique award in 2006), thence becoming one of its permanent fixtures. Bruni also met Vincent Taurelle and Vincent Taeger, and together they formed the improvised music bands, "La Femelle du Taureau", "Portugal City", "Regina Vox" (also featuring Vincent Ségal) and "Le Fils de la Pharmacienne".

Between 2002 and 2004, Bruni worked with Philippe Uminski on various projects, among which were The Stupids Cupids, Dave's album "Doux Tam Tam", Uminski's album "Sauvage" and his cover of "Harder Better Stronger".

In 2003 and 2004, Bruni toured Europe with synthpop singer Emilie Simon and appeared on her third studio album "Vegetal". Around the same period, he co-produced singer Kent's album "Bienvenue au Club" in collaboration with Fred Pallem, Vincent Taurelle and Vincent Taeger; and also recorded with popular singer Francoise Hardy.

In 2005, Bruni played bass while touring with singer Piers Faccini. Also in 2005, he worked with Jean-Louis Pierots (from Les Valentins) on Renan Luce's album "Repenti" (Victoire de la Musique award in 2008). He also worked with Daniel Yvinec on Brisa Roché's album and briefly played alongside singer/actress Charlotte Gainsbourg.

In 2006, Bruni co-produced and played on rapper Oxmo Puccino's concept album "Lipopette Bar" and took the project on the road with newly formed backup band "The Jazzbastards".

In 2007 and 2008, Bruni worked with producer Renaud Letang on Alain Souchon's album "Écoutez d'où ma peine vient" and on singles for singers Julien Doré and Bird Paula. In 2008, he also toured with singer Pauline Croze.

In 2009 and 2010, Bruni went on tour with singer Alain Souchon and opened the music studio La Marquise with longtime collaborators Vincent Taurelle and Vincent Taeger, with whom he co-wrote, produced and recorded rapper Oxmo Puccino's fifth studio album "L'Arme de Paix". The album went on to win a Victoire de la Musique award and was certified gold that same year.

Bruni is currently working on a personal project entitled A.L.B.E.R.T.

== Discography ==
- Le Sacre du Tympan: Le Sacre du Tympan, (Le Chant du Monde, Harmonia mundi, 2002)
- Troupe du phénix: "Le Petit Monde de Georges Brassens" (Universal 2000)
- Alain Souchon: Ecoutez d'où ma peine vient (Virgin Music 2008)
- Philippe Uminski: Sain et Sauf (East West 2005)
- Loane: Jamais seule (EMI 2008)
- Dave: Doux tam tam (Warner 2004)
- Emilie Simon: Emilie Simon Live bonus (Barclay 2004)
- Renan Luce: Repenti ( Barclay 2007 )
- Julien Doré: "Ersatz" (Sony/BMG -2008)
- Jean Guidoni: La pointe rouge (Wagram Music 2007)
- Alain Souchon: Alain Souchon est chanteur (Virgin 2010)
- Kent: "Bienvenue au club" (AZ- universal) 2005
- Françoise Hardy: "Tant De Belles Choses" Virgin Music (France)2004
- Le Sacre du Tympan: Le Retour ! (Label Bleu, 2005)
- Brisa Roché: the chase" (EMI- blue note) 2005
- Fabien Martin: Comme un seul homme (Mercury - Universal Music 2007)
- Philippe Uminski: Sauvage (East West 2002)
- Philippe Uminski – Harder, Better, Faster, Stronger (Uminski Self-released)
- Kent: "L'homme de mars" (AZ-Universal) (2008)
- Hommage à Boris Vian "on est pas là pour se faire engueuler" AZ/ Universal (2009)
- Tom Poisson: Riche à millions ( Naïve 2008)
- Mike Ibrahim: La Route du Nord (Mercury - Universal Music )
- Le Sacre du Tympan: La grande ouverture (Atmosphériques, 2008)
- Renan Luce: Le Clan des miros (Barclay 2009)
- Emilie Simon: Végétal (Barclay 2006)
- Maurane: "Nougaro ou l'esperance en l'homme" (Polydor/ UNiversal -2009)
- Oxmo Puccino: Lipopette Bar ( Blue Note 2006)
- Kent: Panorama" (Thoobett/ L'autre distribution- 2009)
- Le Sacre du Tympan: SoundTrax (Music Unit/L'autre distribution, 2011)
- Troupe du phénix: "Splendeur et mort de Joaquin Murieta" (autoproduit) 2003
- Oxmo Puccino: L'Arme de Paix (Cinq 7, Wagram 2009)
- Olivier Neveux: Baby Hyde ( L'Amiral Somnambule 2008)
- Bird Paula: Give into love (Polydor France 2010)
- Gerard Lenorman: Duos de mes chansons (Play On 2011)
- Génération Goldman: My Major Company (2012)
- Bebe: un Pokito de Rocanroll (Emi Spain 2012)
- Charles Berling: Jeune Chanteur ( Believe 2012)
- La Grande Sophie:La Place du Fantôme (Polydor 2012)
- Jean-Louis Aubert: Vingt Ans (Virgin 2012)
- Mélissa Laveaux: "Dying is a Wild Night" (No Format 2013)
- Archimède: "Arcadie" (Sony Music France 2014)
- Oumou Sangaré: "Mogoya" (No Format 2017)
