= Late Night (song) =

Single by Foals

from the album Holy Fire
- Released: 22 April 2013
- Recorded: 2012
- Genre: Indie rock, progressive rock
- Label: Transgressive
- Songwriters: Foals (Jack Bevan, Walter Gervers, Yannis Philippakis, Jimmy Smith)
- Producers: Flood; Alan Moulder

Foals singles chronology
"My Number" (2012)	"Late Night" (2013)	"Bad Habit" (2013)

"Late Night" is a song by British rock band Foals, which was released as the third single from their third studio album Holy Fire. The song debuted on 13 December 2012 during the band's appearance on Channel 4's "Live from Abbey Road" sessions before the release of the album. A video for the single, directed by Nabil, was released on 11 March 2013.

Single artwork is by Leif Podhajsky.

== Track listing ==
UK 2-track promo CD
No.	Title	Length
1.	"Late Night" (radio edit)	4:13
2.	"Late Night" (album version)	5:27

7" single
No.	Title	Length
1.	"Late Night"	5:28
2.	"Late Night" (Koreless Purple Cowboy Remix)	4:00

Digital release
No.	Title	Length
1.	"Late Night"	5:28
2.	"Late Night" (Koreless Purple Cowboy Remix)	4:00
3.	"Late Night" (Chad Valley Remix)	4:44
4.	"Late Night" (CCTV Remix)	7:28

== Charts ==
Chart (2013)	Peak position
Mexico Ingles Airplay (Billboard)	35
UK Singles Chart (Official Charts Company)	146

== Certifications ==
Region	Certification	Certified units/sales
United Kingdom (BPI)	Silver	200,000^{‡}
^{‡} Sales+streaming figures based on certification alone.
