= Bad Habit (Foals song) =

Single by Foals

from the album Holy Fire
- Released: 19 July 2013
- Recorded: 2012
- Length: 4:40
- Label: Transgressive
- Songwriters: Foals (Jack Bevan, Edwin Congreave, Walter Gervers, Yannis Philippakis, Jimmy Smith)
- Producers: Flood; Alan Moulder

Foals singles chronology
"Late Night" (2013)	"Bad Habit" (2013)	"Out of the Woods" (2013)

"Bad Habit" is the fourth single by British indie rock band Foals, from their third studio album Holy Fire. The official video, unveiled on 17 June 2013, was directed by Nabil where visual effects were created by GloriaFX and features lead singer Yannis Philippakis wandering through a desert following a nude woman. The song has been featured in a BBC promotion for its Summer of Music in May 2013.

The single artwork was done by Leif Podhajsky.

== Track listing ==
UK 2-track promo CD
No.	Title	Length
1.	"Bad Habit" (radio edit)	4:01
2.	"Bad Habit" (album version)	4:40

Digital EP
No.	Title	Length
1.	"Bad Habit"	4:40
2.	"Bad Habit" (Alex Metric Remix)	8:07
3.	"Bad Habit" (Voyeur Remix)	6:46

== Charts ==
Chart (2013)	Peak position
Belgium (Ultratip Bubbling Under Flanders)	89
Mexico Ingles Airplay (Billboard)	41
