= Holy Fire (album) =

Studio album by Foals
- Released: 11 February 2013
- Recorded: 2012
- Studio: Assault & Battery, London
- Genre: Indie rock; post-punk revival; alternative rock; math rock
- Length: 49:50
- Label: Transgressive; Warner Bros.
- Producer: Flood; Alan Moulder

Foals chronology
Total Life Forever (2010)	Holy Fire (2013)	What Went Down (2015)

Singles from Holy Fire
- 1. "Inhaler" Released: 5 November 2012; 2. "My Number" Released: 17 December 2012; 3. "Late Night" Released: 22 April 2013; 4. "Bad Habit" Released: 17 June 2013; 5. "Out of the Woods" Released: 28 October 2013

Holy Fire is the third studio album by British rock band Foals, released on 11 February 2013 in the United Kingdom on Transgressive Records. The first single "Inhaler" first aired on 5 November 2012 on Zane Lowe's BBC Radio 1 show, with the music video being released later that same day. The second single "My Number" debuted on Later... with Jools Holland on 13 November 2012. The track had its radio debut one month later, also on Zane Lowe's BBC Radio 1 show. The music video premiered on 23 January 2013.

The album managed to chart at number two on the UK Albums Chart in the UK and charted across the world including the number one spot on the Australian Albums Chart in Australia and number 86 on the Billboard 200 in the US. The album also received favourable reviews and was nominated for the 2013 Mercury Prize for best album.

== Recording and music ==
The band started demoing in early 2011 in Sydney, Australia with Jono Ma from the Lost Valentinos as the producer. Ma had already worked with the band in the past in the form of remix work. Keyboardist Edwin Congreave would later admit that the band didn't accomplish much in terms of new songs during the recording sessions in Sydney, however he stated "[i]t wasn't like wasted, it was kind of disappointing. [Jono Ma]'s got his fingers all over the place. He's opened our eyes to a lot of possibilities on the new record, synthesizers and drum machines that we haven't used before. It's given us a foundation to take our new record".

Eventually, the band stockpiled various sound loops and samples, old synthesizers and drum machines for using on the recording of the album.

After a few more demo and recording sessions throughout 2011 and 2012 in Oxford, the band went to record the album with production duo Flood and Alan Moulder and engineer CJ Marks at Assault & Battery Studios in Willesden, North West London.

In August 2012, lead singer and guitarist Yannis Philippakis told NME that the new album would be "unashamedly funk", adding that "[t]here are some heavier moments and some dirtier moments. It's swampy, some of the grooves are quite stinky".

The album artwork was designed by Leif Podhajsky, and the original photo is by Thomas Nebbia.

== Promotion and release ==
On 8 October 2012, the band announced a UK tour for November and December. On 19 October, the band announced the name of the album via their official Facebook page. One week later, a similar announcement revealed that the album would be released on 11 February 2013.

On 7 February 2013, the band played an exclusive NME Awards Show with an audience of 400 people, debuting new material.

Holy Fire was released on 11 February 2013 in the United Kingdom. Besides being released on CD and as a digital download, the album was also released as a limited vinyl boxset which includes a 12-inch box with exclusive artwork with marble-coloured vinyl, a DVD and bonus CD featuring offcuts, loops and studio workings. The box set also includes six double-sided 12-inch sleeves including lyrics and exclusive artwork, a 24-inch poster, a digital download code and a limited 7" of the single "My Number".

To coincide with the release of the album, the band embarked on a UK tour that ended with two shows at the Royal Albert Hall in London on 28 March 2013. Tickets sold out so quickly that the band decided to put on a matinee show. After this, the band spent a lot of time touring Holy Fire worldwide, including their first festival headline slot at Latitude Festival in Suffolk, UK. this was very successful and well praised, including positive attention from Festival Republic managing director Melvin Benn

== Critical reception ==
Professional ratings
Aggregate scores
Source	Rating
AnyDecentMusic?	7.6/10
Metacritic	76/100
Review scores
Source	Rating
AllMusic	4/5 stars
The A.V. Club	B+
The Guardian	4/5 stars
The Independent	3/5 stars
Mojo	3/5 stars
NME	9/10
Pitchfork	7.6/10
Q	4/5 stars
Rolling Stone	3/5 stars
Spin	8/10

=== Critical ===
Holy Fire holds an average rating of 76 out of 100 on review aggregator Metacritic, indicating "generally favourable reviews". David Renshaw of NME praised it as "a record that bursts out of the speakers" and added that although the album is energetic, "it's the way that the album as a whole unravels and blooms through repeat listens that marks it as Foals' finest moment to date". Drowned in Sound stated that "[n]ot only is Holy Fire utterly sublime, it's a record that's been six years in the making. A record where Foals have focussed their many triumphs and missteps into one cohesive statement". Ian Cohen of Pitchfork called Holy Fire an "ambitious record, one that operates on an artistic economy of scale, where the lustrous production and singles like "My Number" and "Inhaler" do the heavy work of confirming Foals' headliner status".

In a mixed assessment, Andy Gill of The Independent called Holy Fire "a one-sided album: following the soulful 'Late Night', things plummet badly in the second half". Fact's John Calvert stated that "rather than some kind of righteous culmination, Holy Fire is by some way Foals' least interesting record".

== Commercial performance ==
The album debuted at No. 2 in the United Kingdom, which is the highest chart position by the Foals thus far. In the United States, the album debuted at No. 86 on Billboard 200, and No. 23 on Top Rock Albums, selling 6,000 copies in its first week. The album has sold 41,000 copies in the United States as of August 2015.

The lead single "Inhaler" peaked at No. 20 on Billboard's Alternative Songs chart, making it the first time any of the band's singles appeared on American charts. "My Number" peaked at No. 34 on Belgium's Ultratip charts and at No. 83 on Netherlands' Mega Single Top 100.

== Track listing ==
All tracks are written by Foals.

No.	Title	Length
1.	"Prelude"	4:07
2.	"Inhaler"	4:54
3.	"My Number"	4:03
4.	"Bad Habit"	4:40
5.	"Everytime"	4:04
6.	"Late Night"	5:27
7.	"Out of the Woods"	3:25
8.	"Milk & Black Spiders"	5:17
9.	"Providence"	4:08
10.	"Stepson"	4:49
11.	"Moon"	4:53

Where There's Smoke – Loops / Sketches / Figures of Music
No.	Title	Length
1.	"Running"	1:18
2.	"Dubloop"	0:37
3.	"Dub Arp 17_1-11"	2:10
4.	"Milk Loop 1"	0:34
5.	"Milkspiders4"	4:19
6.	"Oldlido"	3:24
7.	"Stepson Ruff"	1:00
8.	"Badhabittake1-14"	5:58
9.	"Ootw Cascade"	0:49
10.	"1.26.OutOfTheWoods"	4:52
11.	"ProvidenceBits30.1"	6:57
12.	"Inhaler Jam"	4:18
13.	"$Cheque SydneySession"	7:02
14.	"Everytime Acid"	1:29
15.	"My Number Yloop"	1:33
16.	"13.02 Prelude Eddy-Edit"	5:54
17.	"14.02 Stepson"	2:09
18.	"25.01StepsonKeysRough"	2:27
19.	"Moon1"	4:27
20.	"LateNightMomma2"	2:45

"My Number" 7" Vinyl
No.	Title	Length
1.	"My Number"
2.	"My Number" (Feed Me Remix)

== Personnel ==
=== Foals ===
- Yannis Philippakis – vocals, guitar
- Jimmy Smith – guitar
- Walter Gervers – bass, backing vocals
- Edwin Congreave – keyboards, backing vocals
- Jack Bevan – drums

=== Additional musicians ===
- Ric Elsworth - additional percussion and marimba (2, 3, 4, 7, 8 and 9)
- London Contemporary Orchestra (2, 3, 6, 8, 10 and 11)

=== Arrangements ===
- Hugh Brunt - conducting and string arrangements (2, 3, 6, 8, 10 and 11)

=== Album Artwork ===
- Leif Podhajsky – design and art direction
- Thomas Nebbia – photography

== Chart performance ==
=== Weekly charts ===
Weekly chart performance for Holy Fire
Chart (2013)	Peak position
Australian Albums (ARIA)	1
Austrian Albums (Ö3 Austria)	39
Belgian Albums (Ultratop Flanders)	25
Belgian Albums (Ultratop Wallonia)	38
French Albums (SNEP)	22
Dutch Albums (Album Top 100)	41
German Albums (Offizielle Top 100)	31
Irish Albums (IRMA)	7
Japanese Albums (Oricon)	69
New Zealand Albums (RMNZ)	15
Scottish Albums (OCC)	3
Spanish Albums (PROMUSICAE)	72
Swiss Albums (Schweizer Hitparade)	15
UK Albums (OCC)	2
US Billboard 200	86
US Top Rock Albums (Billboard)	23

=== Year-end charts ===
Year-end chart performance for Holy Fire
Chart (2013)	Position
Belgian Albums (Ultratop Flanders)	172
UK Albums (OCC)	62
