= What Went Down =

Studio album by Foals
- Released: 28 August 2015
- Recorded: 2014–2015
- Studio: La Fabrique (Saint-Rémy-de-Provence, France)
- Genre: Indie rock; alternative rock; hard rock
- Length: 48:21
- Label: Transgressive; Warner Bros.
- Producer: James Ford

Foals chronology
Holy Fire (2013)	What Went Down (2015)	Everything Not Saved Will Be Lost – Part 1 (2019)

Singles from What Went Down
- 1. "What Went Down" Released: 16 June 2015; 2. "Mountain at My Gates" Released: 21 July 2015; 3. "A Knife in the Ocean" Released: 7 August 2015; 4. "Give It All" Released: 25 December 2015; 5. "Birch Tree" Released: 15 January 2016

What Went Down is the fourth studio album by British rock band Foals, released on 28 August 2015 via Transgressive Records in the United Kingdom. The album is produced by James Ford, known for his work with Simian Mobile Disco, the Last Shadow Puppets and Arctic Monkeys amongst others. Frontman Yannis Philippakis called it their loudest and heaviest record to date. What Went Down debuted at number 3 on the UK Albums Chart and at number 58 on the Billboard 200, making it their highest charting album in the United States to date.

== Promotion and release ==
On 9 June 2015, a 12-second clip teaser of the band performing aggressively in an empty warehouse entitled "FOALS // 2015" was released through their social media. Two days later, it was announced that What Went Down was to be released 28 August 2015 via Transgressive Records with a slightly longer trailer in lieu.

On 16 June, the album's self-titled debut single was debuted on DJ Annie Mac's BBC Radio 1 show, along with the premiere of the music video (directed by Niall O'Brien) via YouTube.

== Reception ==
Professional ratings
Aggregate scores
Source	Rating
AnyDecentMusic?	7.2/10
Metacritic	77/100
Review scores
Source	Rating
AllMusic	4/5 stars
The Daily Telegraph	4/5 stars
Entertainment Weekly	A−
The Guardian	3/5 stars
Mojo	4/5 stars
NME	7/10
Pitchfork	6.7/10
Q	4/5 stars
Rolling Stone	4/5 stars
Uncut	8/10

What Went Down received largely positive reviews from contemporary music critics. At Metacritic, which assigns a normalised rating out of 100 to reviews from mainstream critics, the album received an average score of 77, based on 23 reviews, which indicates "generally favorable reviews".

Mark Beaumont of NME praised the album, saying, "For ‘What Went Down’, written in their Oxford “stinkbox”, they have found their fulcrum. Riffs. Massive, fucking heavy cavern rock riffs, the size of cathedrals and the weight of God's balls. They slammed into your eardrums like wrecking balls the first time you heard the compulsive title-track, aghast that these desert rock goliaths could be the same band that sounded like frivolous disco pixies just two years ago. Opening their fourth album, Yannis roaring “When I see a man I see a lion!” over its Stooges-meets-Queens fuzz throttle, it sounds like a defining statement, an arrival. They've mastered math rock, destroyed disco and flattened funk, now they measure hard rock in their hands like a medicine ball, and find it a comfortable weight."

Ian Cohen of Pitchfork gave the album a generally positive review noting that, "What Went Down is the latest example of Foals’ uncanny ability to make records whose basic musical trajectory and quality are nearly equal regardless of the band's intentions going in. And What Went Down is their most consistent, steady-handed work yet—the distance between their purest pop moments ("Miami", "My Number") and their opulent ballads ("Spanish Sahara") has virtually disappeared. It's also significantly less exciting than Total Life Forever and Holy Fire, dynamic records because of their unevenness and ambitious strain—while Foals have realized a sound that's truly their own, they sound far too comfortable in it."

=== Accolades ===
Publication	Accolade	Year	Rank
NME	NME's Albums of the Year 2015	2015	8

== Track listing ==
No.	Title	Length
1.	"What Went Down"	5:00
2.	"Mountain at My Gates"	4:02
3.	"Birch Tree"	4:21
4.	"Give It All"	4:47
5.	"Albatross"	5:23
6.	"Snake Oil"	4:21
7.	"Night Swimmers"	4:44
8.	"London Thunder"	4:14
9.	"Lonely Hunter"	4:37
10.	"A Knife in the Ocean"	6:52
Total length:		48:21

Digital deluxe edition
No.	Title	Length
11.	"What Went Down" (official video)	5:41
12.	"Mountain at My Gates" (official video)	4:01
13.	"Birch Tree" (lyric video)	4:22
14.	"Give It All" (Poolside Session)	5:41
15.	"Albatross" (CCTV Session)	6:06
16.	"Snake Oil" (CCTV Session)	5:02
17.	"Night Swimmers" (lyric video)	4:43
18.	"London Thunder" (Poolside Session)	4:49
19.	"Lonely Hunter" (CCTV Session)	5:28
20.	"A Knife in the Ocean" (lyric video)	6:54
21.	"Crème anglaise" (Making of What Went Down) (iTunes exclusive)	27:58

Deluxe edition DVD
No.	Title	Length
1.	"Crème anglaise" (Making of What Went Down)	27:59
2.	"What Went Down" (official video)	5:48
3.	"Give It All" (Poolside Session)	5:40
4.	"London Thunder" (Poolside Session)	4:47

== Personnel ==
Foals

- Yannis Philippakis – vocals, guitar, art direction
- Jack Bevan – drums
- Jimmy Smith – guitar, keyboards
- Walter Gervers – bass, backing vocals
- Edwin Congreave – keyboards, backing vocals

Technical personnel

- James Ford – producer, additional keyboards, guitar & percussion
- Jimmy Robertson – engineer
- Damien Arlot – studio assistant
- Alan Moulder – mixing at Assault & Battery Studios, London
- Caesar Edmunds – mix assistant
- John Davis – mastering at Metropolis Studios, London
- Foals – studio photography
- Daisuke Yokota – artwork and additional photography
- Neil Krug – additional photography
- Mike Lythgoe – design

DVD personnel

- Kit Monteith and Foals – filming and editing of "Crème anglaise" and the Poolside Sessions
- Niall O'Brien – director of "What Went Down"
- Liz Kessler – producer of "What Went Down"

== Charts ==
=== Weekly charts ===
Weekly chart performance for What Went Down
Chart (2015)	Peak position
Australian Albums (ARIA)	3
Austrian Albums (Ö3 Austria)	36
Belgian Albums (Ultratop Flanders)	17
Belgian Albums (Ultratop Wallonia)	14
Dutch Albums (Album Top 100)	4
French Albums (SNEP)	14
German Albums (Offizielle Top 100)	26
Hungarian Albums (MAHASZ)	15
Irish Albums (IRMA)	5
Italian Albums (FIMI)	86
Japanese Albums (Oricon)	134
New Zealand Albums (RMNZ)	5
Portuguese Albums (AFP)	15
Spanish Albums (Promusicae)	33
Swiss Albums (Schweizer Hitparade)	9
UK Albums (OCC)	3
US Billboard 200	58

=== Year-end charts ===
Year-end chart performance for What Went Down
Chart (2015)	Position
UK Albums (OCC)	71

== Certifications ==
Certifications for What Went Down
Region	Certification	Certified units/sales
New Zealand (RMNZ)	Gold	7,500^{‡}
United Kingdom (BPI)	Gold	100,000^{‡}
^{‡} Sales+streaming figures based on certification alone.
