= Brisa Roché =

American singer, composer, and songwriter

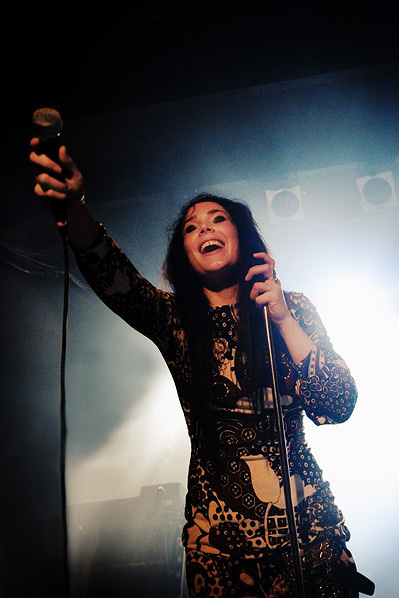
- Image of Brisa Roché

Background information
- Born: April 26, 1976 (age 50); Arcata, California
- Genres: Jazz, pop
- Occupations: Singer, songwriter, musician
- Instrument: Vocals
- Years active: 2003–present
- Website: www.brisaroche.com

Brisa Roché (born April 26, 1976 in Arcata, California) is an American singer-songwriter who sings primarily in English, occasionally in French, and who has spent much of her life residing in France.

== Early life and career ==
Roché was raised by an artist mother and initially her adventurer father, then her stepfather (after her father moved to Seattle).

Growing up with her family and surroundings in a small, electricity-free cabin, shared with her mother and stepfather in Arcata, northern California (known for redwood forests and artistic communities), music played a major influence in Roché’s life. It was a childhood neighbour who introduced her to the drums, which she later swapped for the guitar.

At 16, Roché moved to Seattle to be with her ailing father, at a time grunge music was coming to the fore in the city. She found escape from her personal challenges by immersing herself in Seattle's music scene, playing in a local band, the Amazing Dimestore, having traded her acoustic guitar for an electric one.

Following her father's death, she moved to Paris, and began busking at age 18 in the Paris Metro. The founders of Glazart club in Paris then noticed Roché, which consequently led to opportunities to start singing in the jazz clubs of Saint-Germain-des-Prés, where a few years later she was discovered and signed to Blue Note.

Roché has performed folk, garage, psyche-pop, soul and electronica. Her first album (on a label), The Chase, was released 5 October 2005 in Paris; reviewing the album in Billboard, Aymeric Pichevin wrote, "A PJ Harvey fan, Roché delivers jazzy tunes with a punk spirit." In 2016, Roché released Invisible 1. She returned to the United States in the course of writing her fourth album, which Rolling Stone described as "succeed[ing] in capturing the essence of pop in order to restore it to a song that was both pure and sensual."

== Discography ==
=== Albums ===
- 2003: Soothe Me (self-release - no label)
- 2005: The Chase (Blue Note / Capitol)
- 2007: Takes (Discograph)
- 2010: All Right Now (Discograph)
- 2016: invisible1 (Kwaidan Records)
- 2018: Father (Black Ash)
- 2019: Low Fidelity (Black Ash)
- 2021: Freeze Where U R (with Fred Fortuny - Black Ash)
- 2022: BRMD (with IX - Black Ash)
- 2023: Hero Palo (Black Ash)
