= Cold Mailman =

Norwegian indie pop band

Cold Mailman is a Norwegian indie pop band, originally from Bodø, currently based in Oslo. The band was started by Ivar Bowitz (guitar and vocals), but now also consists of Martin Bowitz on bass, Stian Hansen on drums, Torbjørn Hafnor on guitar, Catharina Sletner (on synthesizers and vocals), and Martin Smådal Larsen on guitar. The band members have played in bands like The Spectacle, Beyond The Fences and Lukestar, and both Hafnor and Hansen are playing in the band Kollwitz.

The band released their debut studio album How To Escape Cause And Effect in 2008, followed by Relax; The Mountain Will Come To You in 2010, Heavy Hearts, which was released by Beyond Records in 2013, Everything Aflutter in 2015 and Baby Wake up We Are Losing the Fire in 2020.

Both of the band's music videos, "My Recurring Dream" and "Time Is of the Essence", are directed by the Norwegian director André Chocron, and have achieved a lot of views and attention, both from music blogs and video awards. "Time Is of the Essence" was nominated for Spellemannprisen (the Norwegian Grammy) in 2011, and "My Recurring Dream" was nominated for The UK Music Video Awards in 2013.

== Discography ==
Album

Title	Released	Record label
How To Escape Cause And Effect	2008	Spoon Train Audio
Relax; The Mountain Will Come To You	2010	Kråkesølv Recordings/Diger
Heavy Hearts	2013	Beyond Records
Everything Aflutter	2015	Spoon Train Audio
Baby Wake up We Are Losing the Fire	2020	Snertingdal Records

Singles

Title	Released	Record label
Pull Yourself Together and Fall in Love With Me	2010	Kråkesølv Recordings/Diger
Time Is of the Essence	2010	Kråkesølv Recordings/Diger
My Recurring Dream	2013	Beyond Records
Venetian Blinds	2013	Beyond Records
Future Ex	2013	Beyond Records
