= Yannis Philippakis =

Greek-born musician (born 1986)

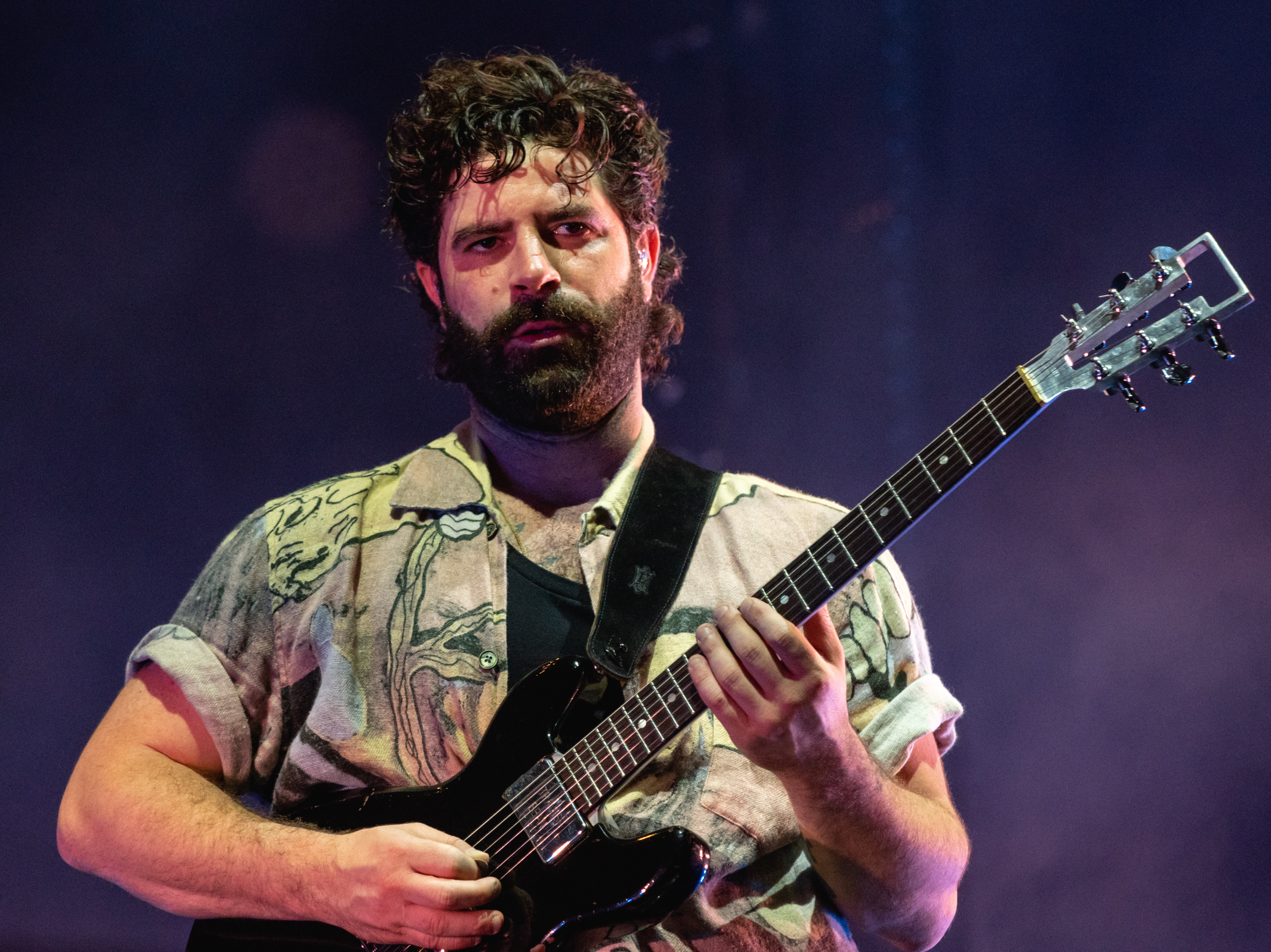
- Philippakis in 2021

Background information
- Born: Yannis Barnabas Emanuel Philippakis; 23 April 1986 (age 40); Olympos, Karpathos, Greece
- Origin: Oxford, England
- Genres: Dance-punk; indie rock; math rock; progressive rock
- Occupations: Singer; songwriter; guitarist
- Instruments: Vocals; guitar; keyboards; bass; drums
- Years active: 2003–present
- Labels: Transgressive (UK); Sub Pop (US)
- Member of: Foals; Yannis & The Yaw
- Formerly of: The Edmund Fitzgerald
- Website: www.foals.co.uk

Yannis Barnabas Emanuel Philippakis (Greek: Ιωάννης "Γιάννης" Φιλιππάκης) (born 23 April 1986) is a Greek-born English singer, songwriter and guitarist. He is a founding member and the lead vocalist of the British indie rock band Foals, with whom he has released seven studio albums since their founding in 2005.

Philippakis occasionally works on separate music projects individually, such as interviews and collaborations.

== Early life ==
Born to a Greek father and a South African Jewish mother, Philippakis lived in Greece until he was four years old when his family moved to South Africa. Each summer, he would visit his father in Olympos on the Greek island Karpathos. His father played a significant role in his life regarding music, teaching him traditional Greek songs. Philippakis was raised in the Greek Orthodox religion.

== Education ==
Philippakis was educated at Magdalen College School. There, he had met all of the requirements for an assisted place at Magdalen, where he had taken classes on French, literature, and art. While attending school, Philippakis faced many difficulties due to his father's absence; he would get into trouble with the teachers and was ill-tempered. This led to him being suspended twice. Philippakis then went on to study English literature at St John's College, Oxford; he dropped out before completing his degree to focus on the band.

== Career ==
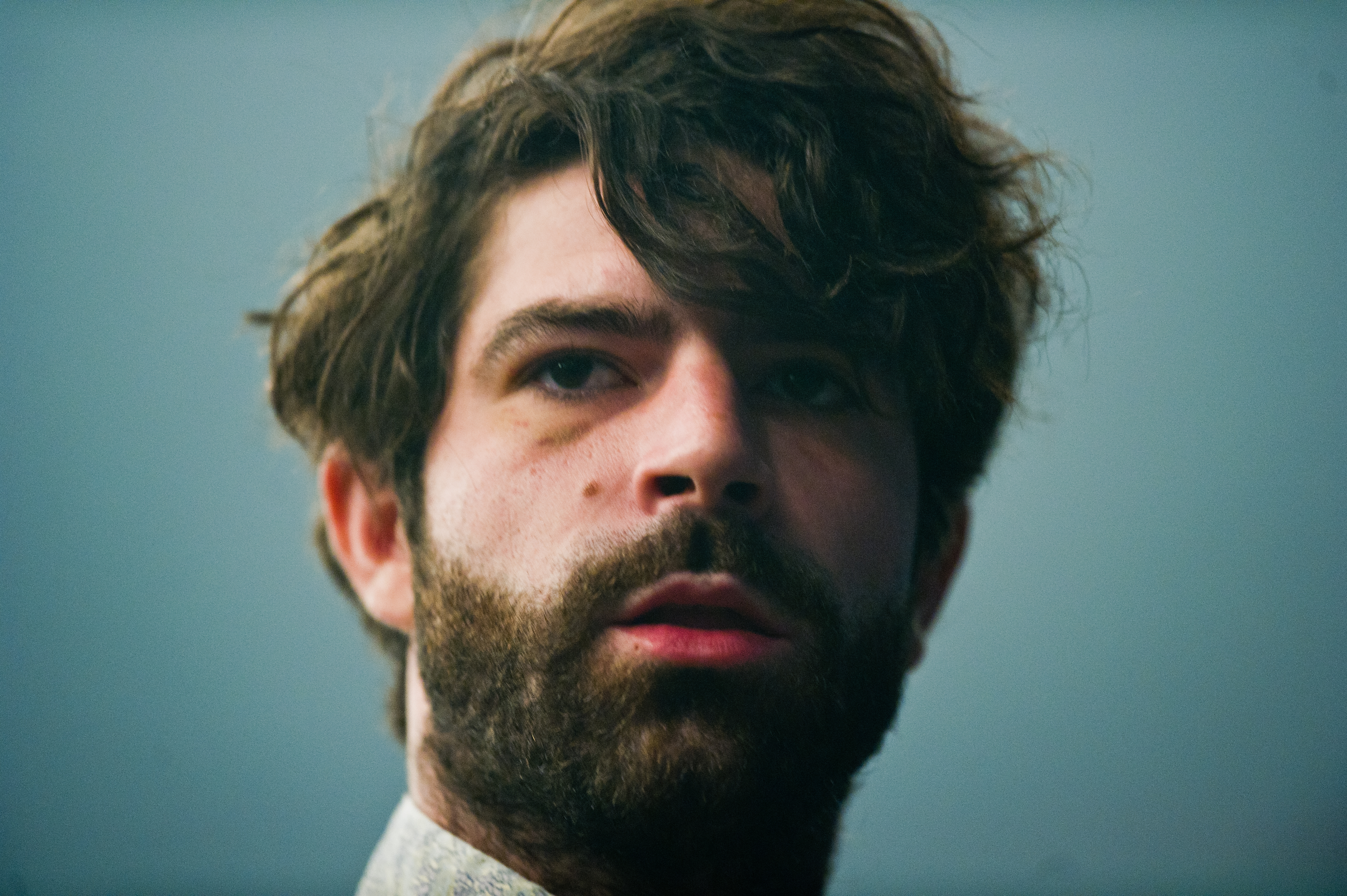
Philippakis in 2011

=== Music ===
==== Foals ====
Philippakis formed Foals in 2005 with friend and former Youthmovies frontman Andrew Mears after the break-up of his former band the Edmund Fitzgerald, which also featured his Foals bandmate, drummer Jack Bevan.

==== Yannis & The Yaw ====
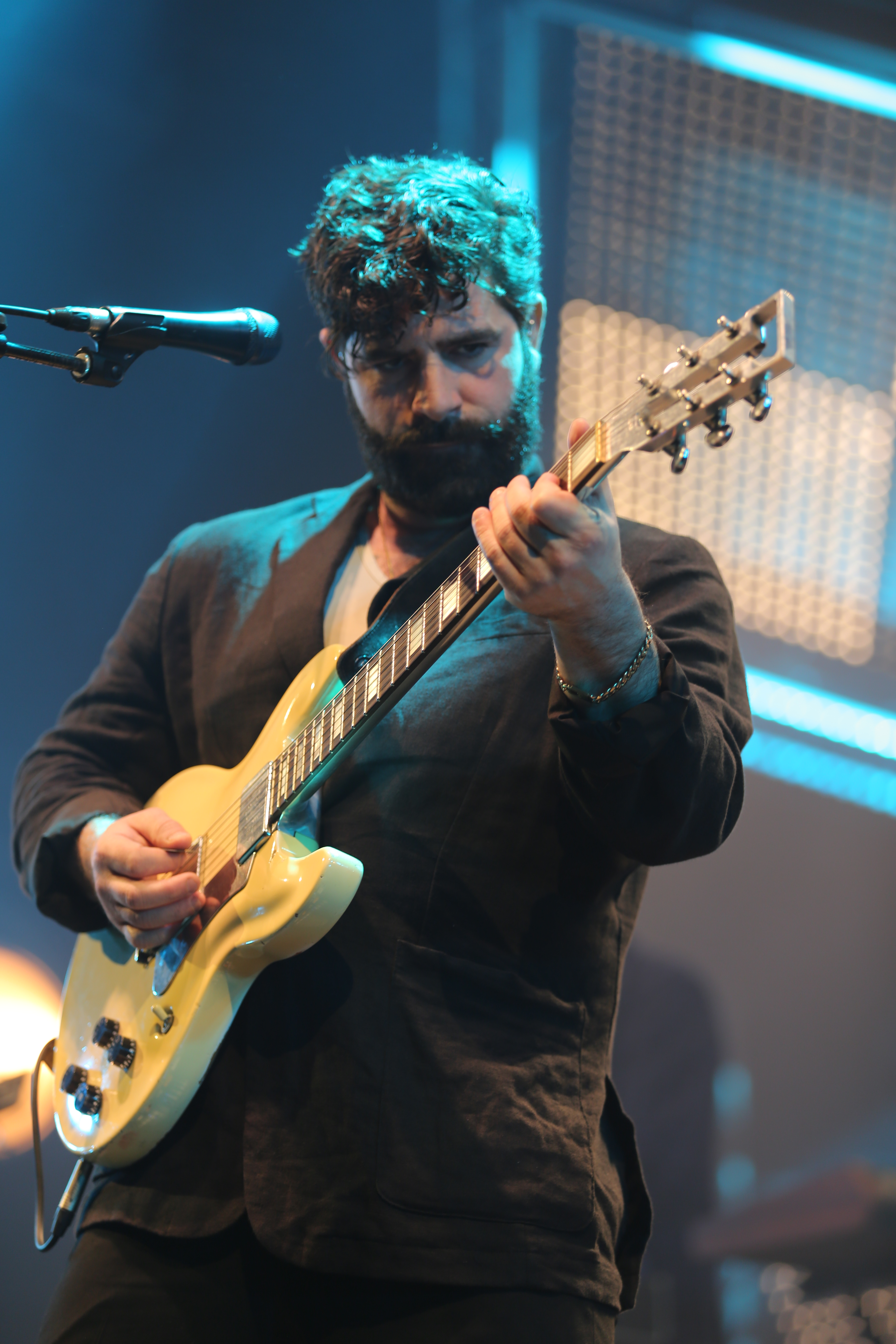
Philippakis performing at Trans Musicales 2024

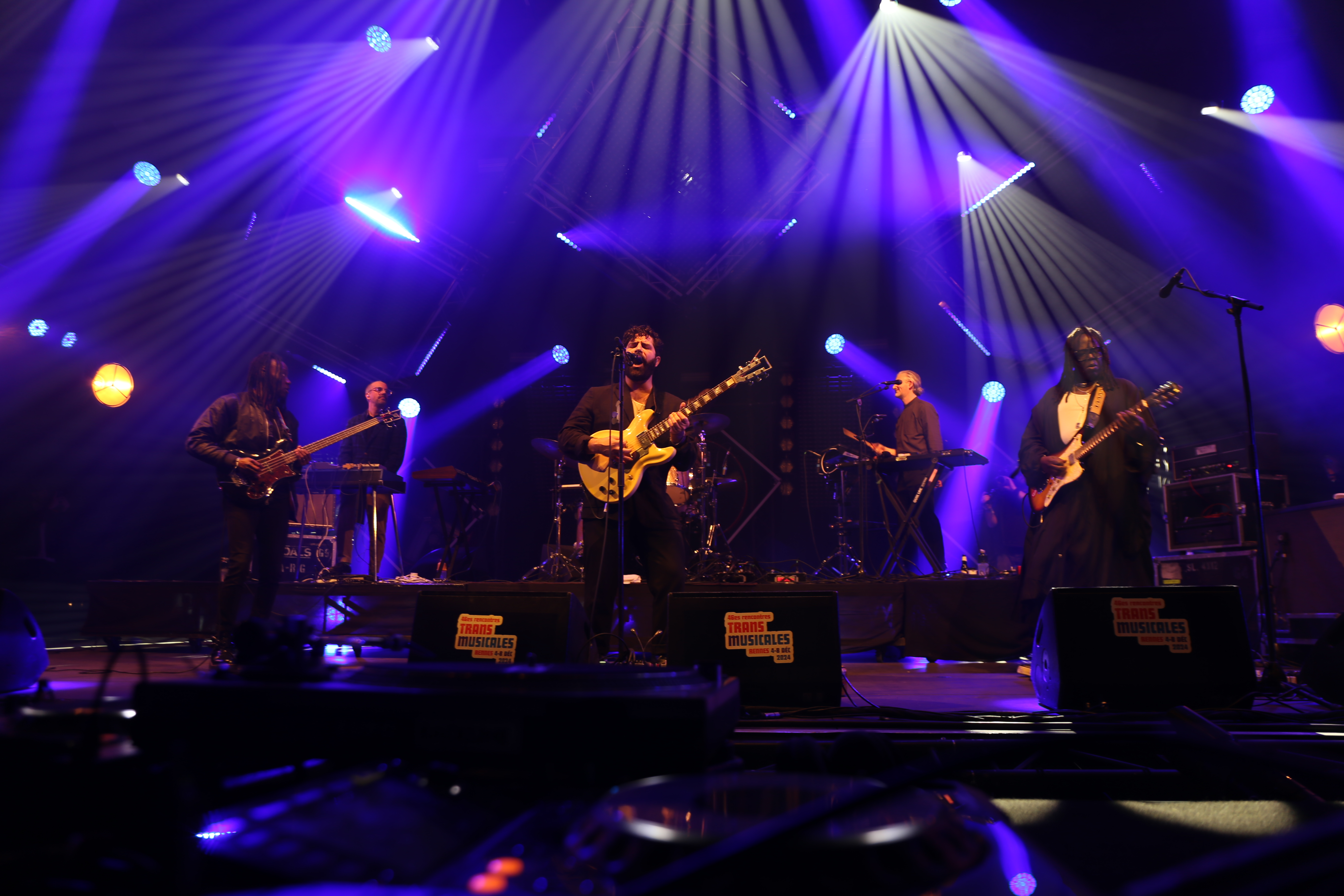
Yannis & the Yaw at Trans Musicales 2024

In April 2024, Philippakis announced a new project named Yannis & The Yaw; simultaneously announcing its debut EP with the late Nigerian musician Tony Allen titled Lagos Paris London. It was released on 30 August 2024 via Transgressive Records. The first song from the five-track EP, "Walk Through Fire", was released on 14 April 2024. It is a project to which Philippakis plans to return in the future, "with inspiring musicians from across the globe".

==== Other musical projects ====
In a BBC 6 hub session interview, Philippakis expressed his desire to write a 'ballet with beats'.

In 2010, Philippakis appeared and was interviewed in the documentary Anyone Can Play Guitar.

Philippakis produced the track "Wolf" on Trophy Wife's 2011 EP Bruxism.

In January 2018, Philippakis began a monthly club night in south London called MILK. Special guests are kept secret until the night of the performance, making each night different. Every night at MILK is recorded and made available in limited numbers on vinyl for purchase at the following month's event. Philippakis said, "I want to make a club night that me & my friends would want to go to. Where the night acts like a sort of dream collider of different musicians in the hope of the surprising, the life affirming & the downright dirty."

In 2020, Grammy-nominated producer duo, CamelPhat, released "Hypercolour" featuring Philippakis. The Liverpool duo had stated they were "longtime fans of Foals" and "have always been on [their] list to collaborate with" in an interview with Forbes.

A month after the initial release of "Hypercolour", CamelPhat released the official visualizer on their YouTube channel. The video itself is directed by Philippakis alongside Kit Moneith and features Philippakis himself against a backdrop of colourful psychedelic imagery and kaleidoscopic scenes.

=== Other ===
He performed as an actor in an adaptation of Marguerite Duras' Moderato Cantabile, directed by Alexander Zeldin.

== TV appearances ==
=== Individually ===
- Never Mind the Buzzcocks

=== With Foals ===
- Later... with Jools Holland
- Skins (released as a MySpace exclusive; then aired by E4)
- The Culture Show
- T-Mobile's Transmission
- The Album Chart Show
- Barclaycard Mercury Prize Sessions
- Live from Abbey Road
- The Late Show with Stephen Colbert
- Austin City Limits (with Alejandro Escovedo & Peter Buck)
- Glastonbury Festival (2019 and 2022 BBC coverage)

== Discography ==
Albums (as part of Foals)

- Antidotes (2008)
- Total Life Forever (2010)
- Holy Fire (2013)
- What Went Down (2015)
- Everything Not Saved Will Be Lost – Part 1 (2019)
- Everything Not Saved Will Be Lost – Part 2 (2019)
- Life Is Yours (2022)

Albums and EPs (as Yannis & The Yaw)

- Lagos Paris London (2024)
- Onstage (2025)
