= List of dishes from the Caucasus =

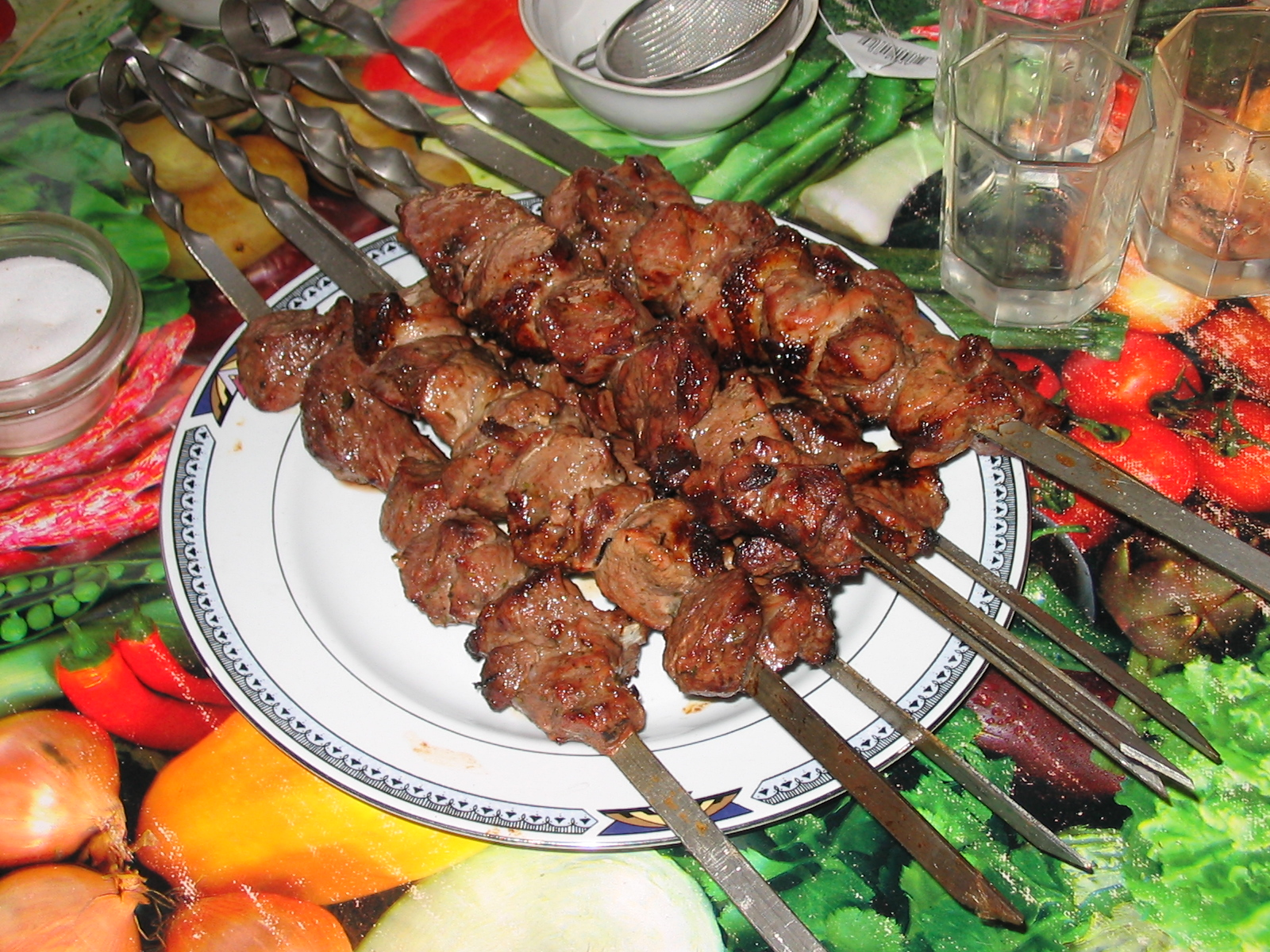
Shashlyk is a dish of skewered and grilled cubes of meat that is known traditionally, by various other names, in the Caucasus and Central Asia.

This article provides a list of dishes originating from the Caucasus. Caucasian culinary tradition includes that of Armenians, Azerbaijanis, Georgians, and of all other ethnic groups in the Caucasus, such as Chechens, Circassians, Ossetians, and many others.

== Traditional dishes ==
=== Cheese ===
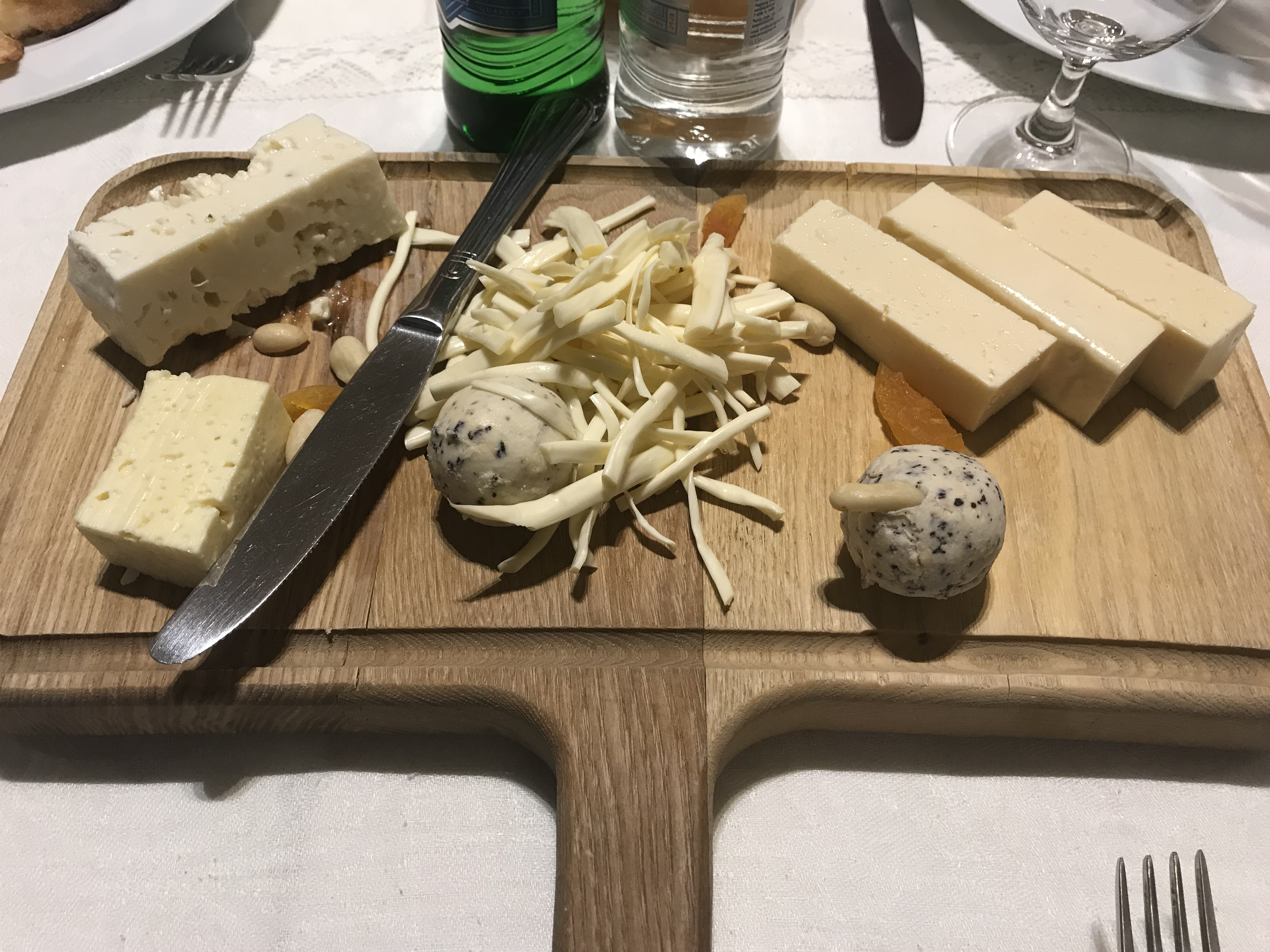
A spread of traditional Armenian cheeses served at an Armenian restaurant

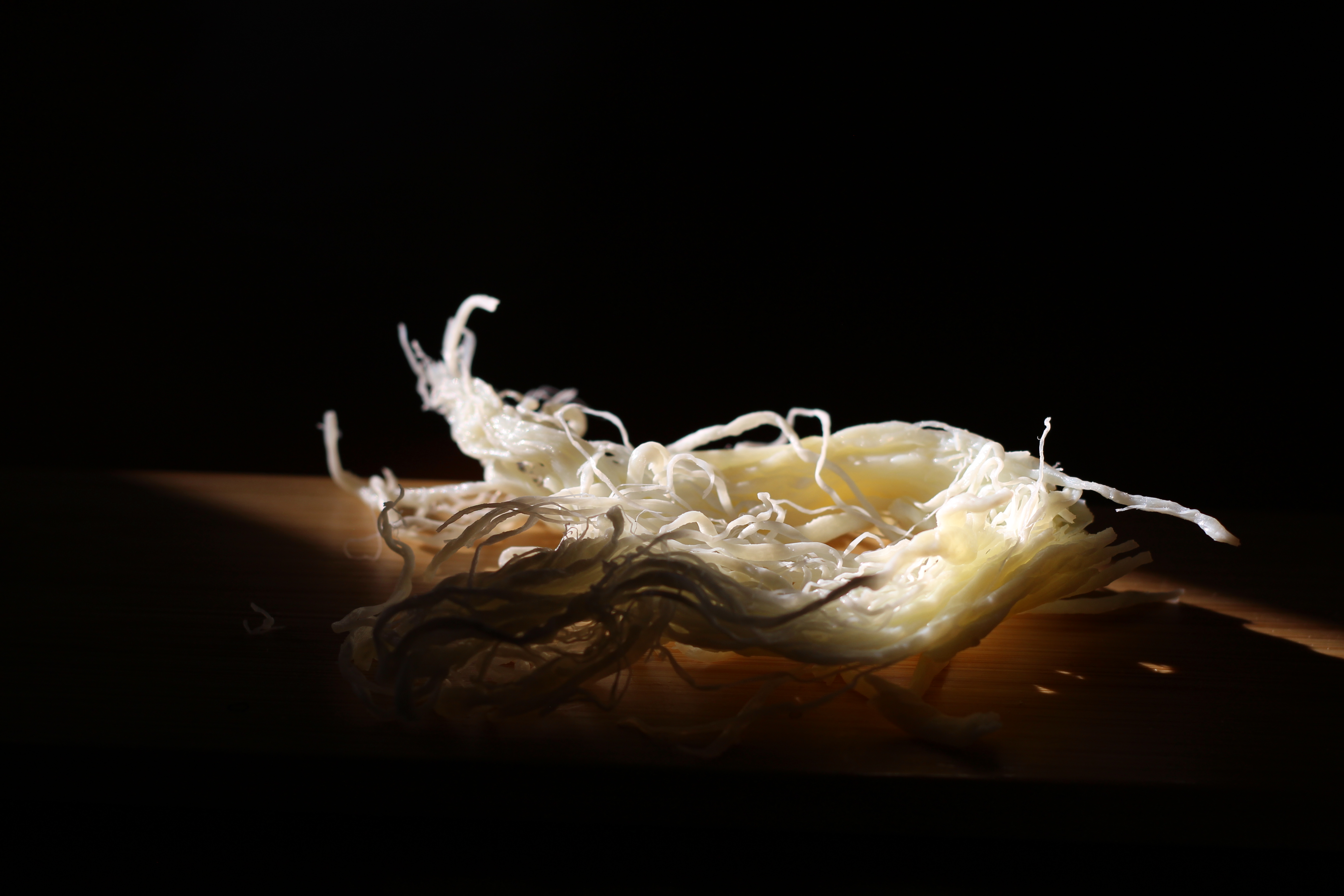
Armenian tel panir

- Ktor panir (կտոր պանիր) — is an Armenian traditional soft cheese made from sheep's, cow's milk, or a mixture of both.
- Ashvlagwan (Ашвлагуан) — Abkhaz smoked cheese, similar to sulguni.
- Chechil (Չեչիլ) — String (often smoked) cheese, made in Armenia.
- Adyga kwae (Адыгэ Къуае) — Mild cheese, made in Circassia.
- Yeghegnadzor (Եղեգնաձոր) also known as horats panir (հորած պանիր) — is a traditional Armenian semi-soft cheese originating from the town of Yeghegnadzor in the Vayots Dzor Province of Armenia.
- Chkinti (ჭყინტი) — Salty cheese made originally in Imereti.
- Chanakh (չանախ) — Armenian brined cheese with a sharp, salty flavor and dense texture
- Dambalkhacho (დამბალხაჭო) — "Rotten" cheese made in Pshavi and Mtiuleti.
- Motal (մոթալ) — Armenian brined cheese made from sheep's or goat's milk, traditionally produced in the Syunik and Artsakh regions.
- Guda (გუდა) — Cheese made from sheep milk in Tusheti. Its preparation takes 20 days.
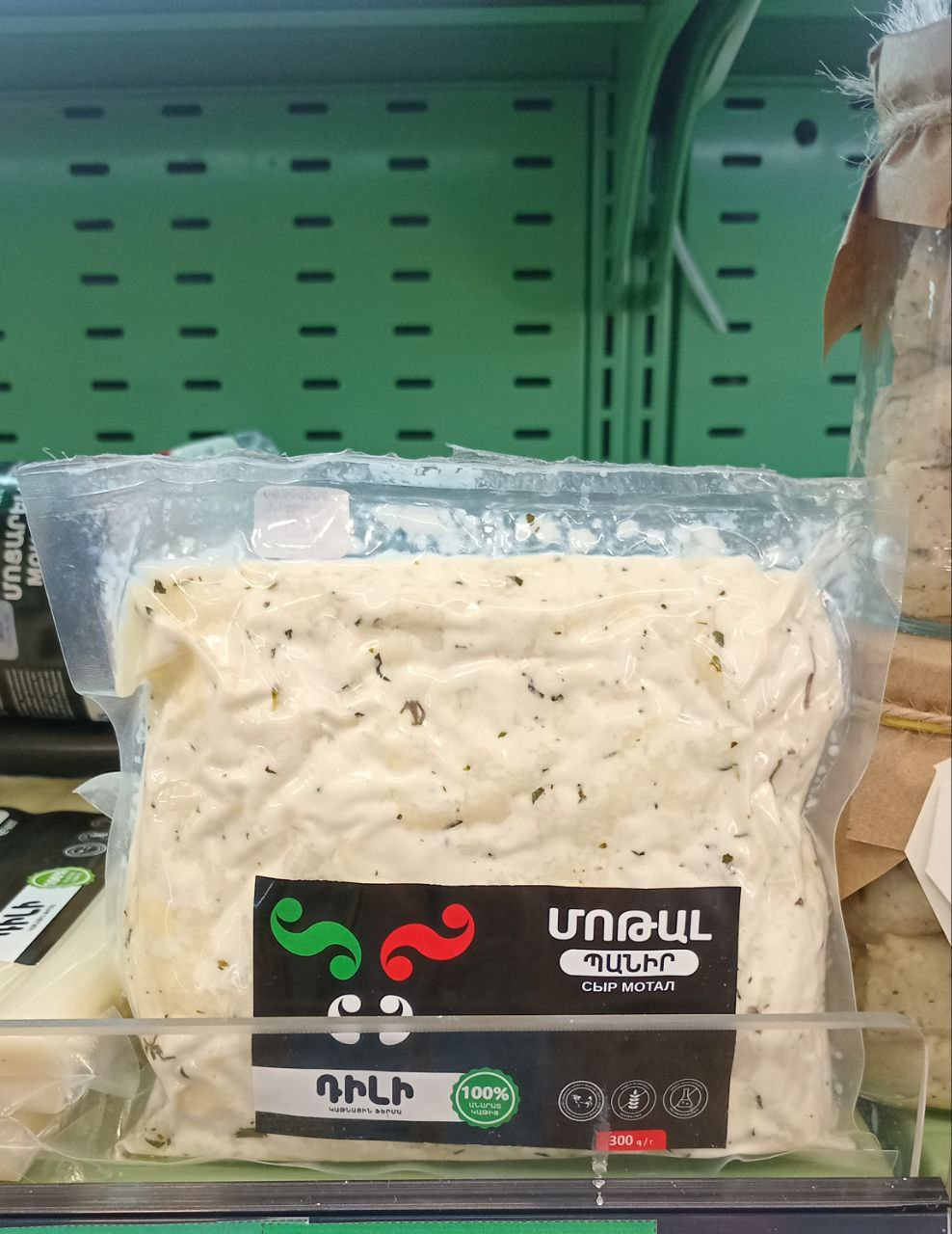
  Armenian motal cheese being sold at a store
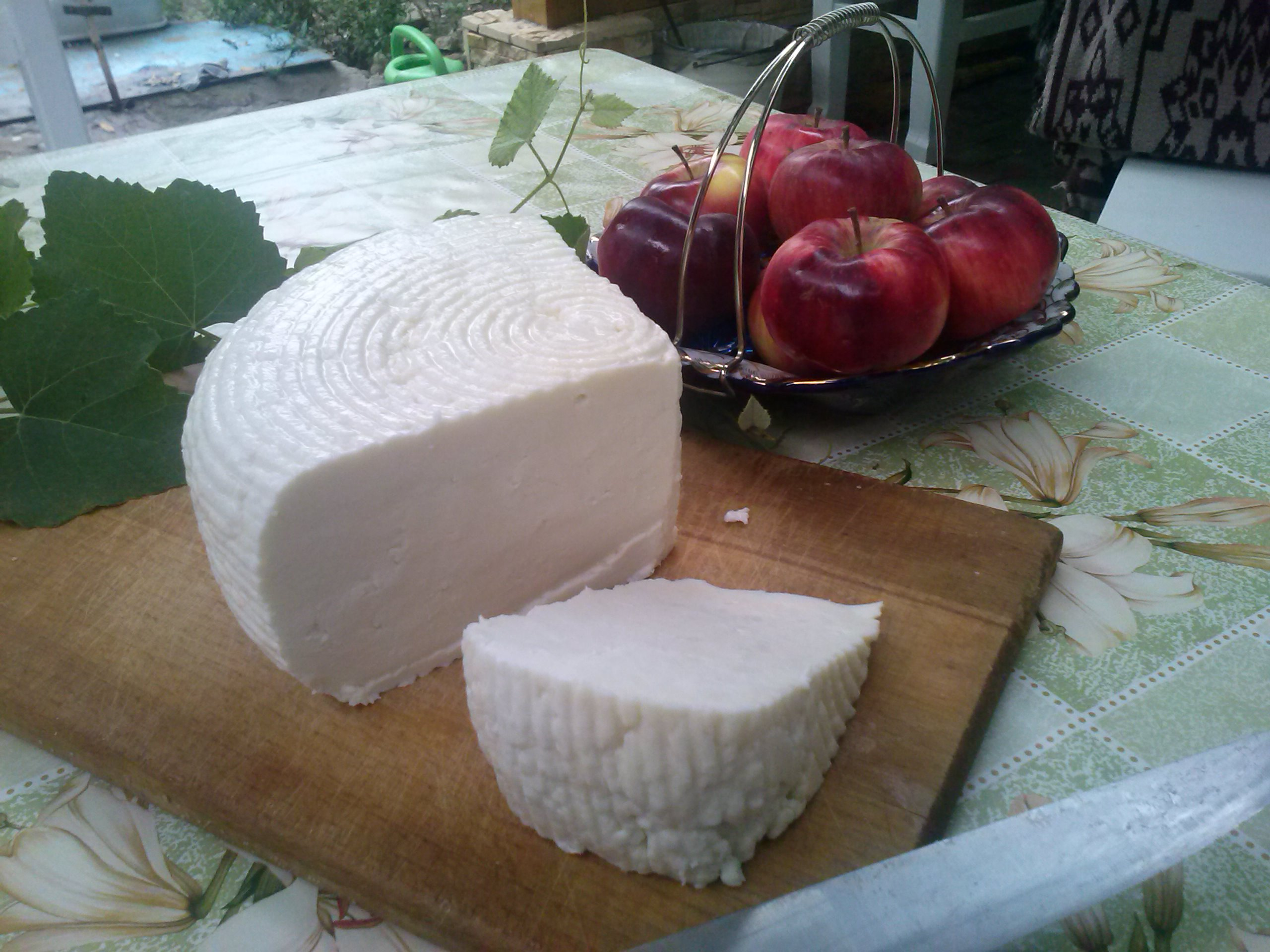
  Circassian cheese

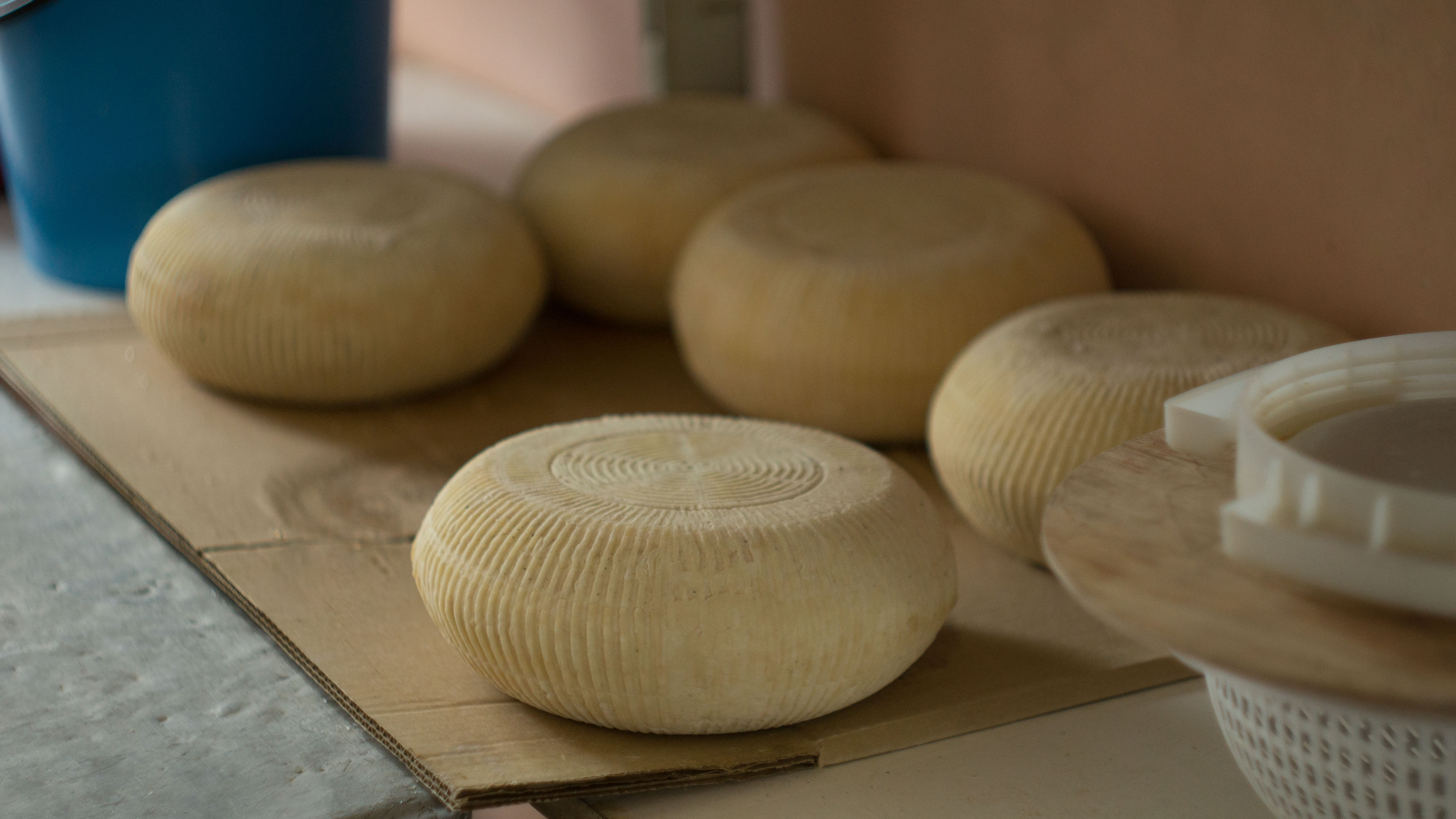
Ossetian cheese

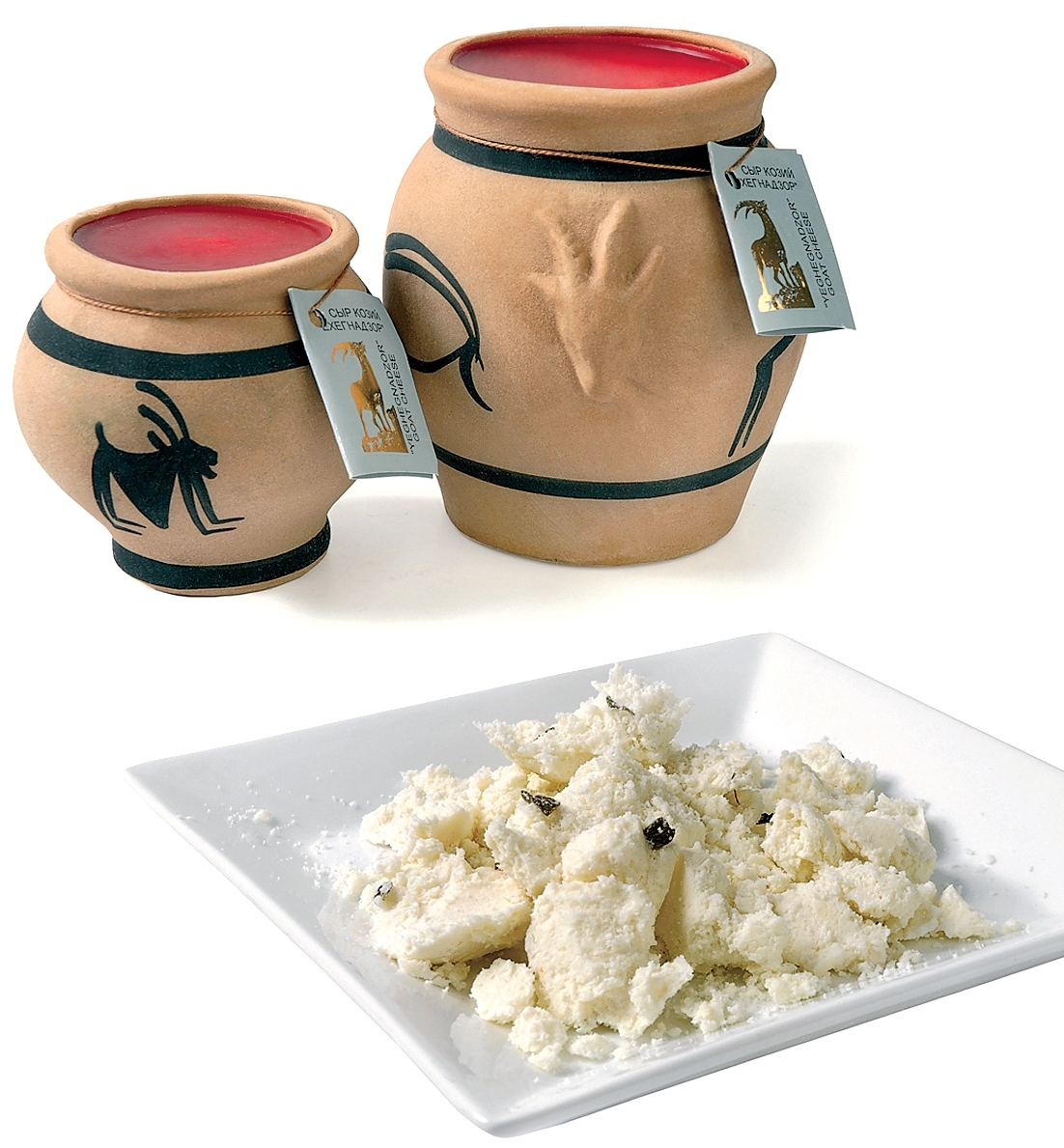
Armenian yehegnadzor cheese

- Earon tsykht (Ирон Цыхт) — Cheese made in Ossetia.
- Kanach panir (կանաչ պանիր) — Mold-ripened Armenian cheese from Shirak, with a greenish look, crumbly texture, and sharp flavor.
- Lori (լոռի) — Armenian semi-soft cheese made from pasteurized cow's milk.
- Sulguni (სულგუნი) — One of the best-known cheeses from Mingrelia, made from cow or buffalo milk.
- Tel panir (թել պանիր) — Armenian string cheese made from fermented milk, braided into fine threads and typically preserved in brine.
- To-beram (ТIо-берам) — Cottage cheese mixed with sour cream, made traditionally in Chechnya and in Ingushetia.

=== Dough ===
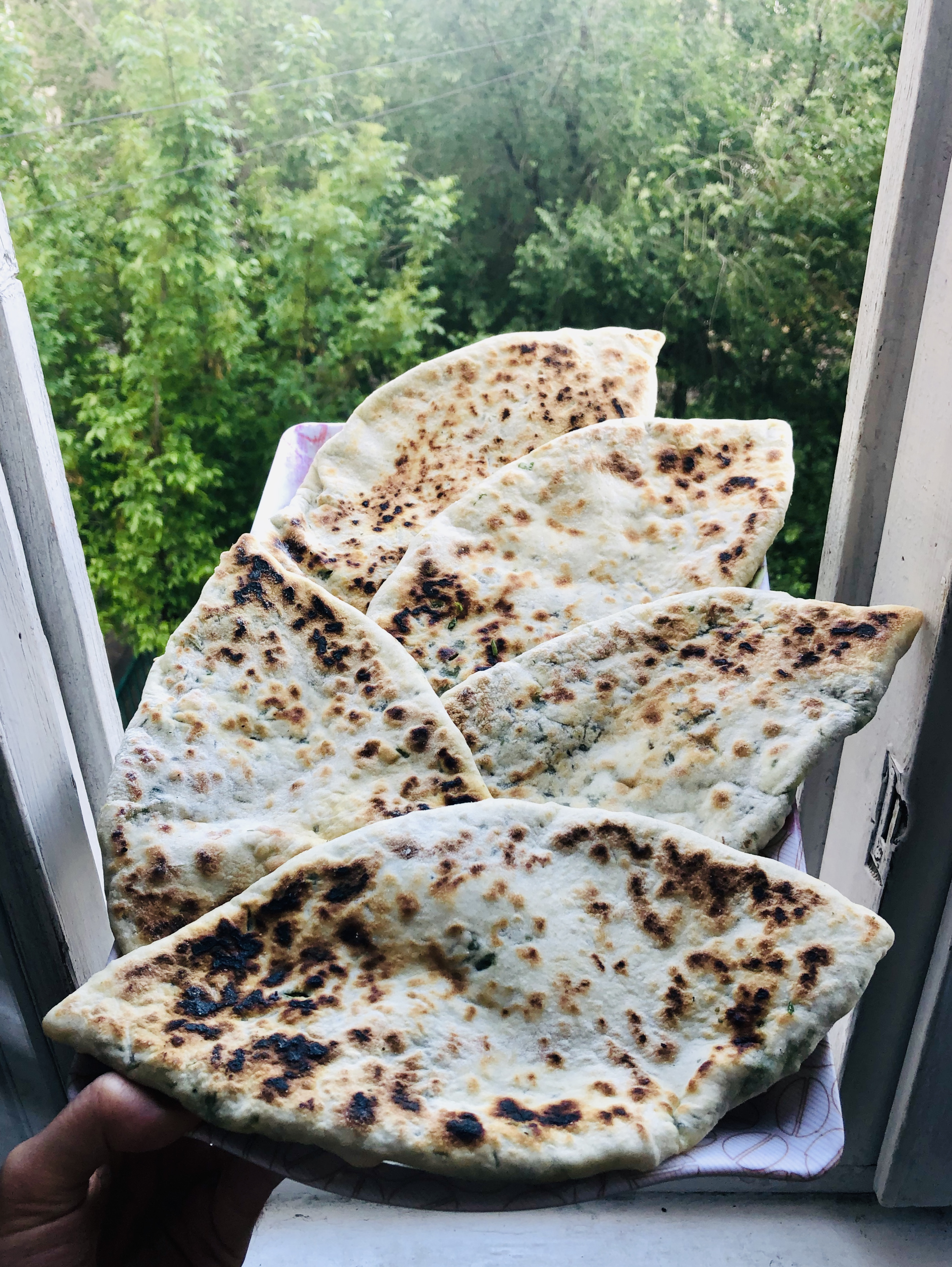
Multiple Armenian zhingyalov hats

- Zhingyalov hats (Ժենգյալով հաց) — Armenian flatbread stuffed with diced herbs such as tarragon, mint, parsley, purple basil, vegetables such as spinach and spices, then baked.
- Achma (აჩმა / Ачма) — Fluffy pastry with cheese, traditionally made in Georgia, especially in Abkhazia.
- Afarar (Афарар) — Lezgian flatbread stuffed with various fillings, mostly meat or cottage cheese.
- Semsek (սեմսեկ) — is an Armenian dish made with a smooth dough that is topped with a mixture of minced meat, herbs, and spices, then baked.
- Chepalgash (ЧIепалгаш) — Chechen and Ingush pie filled with cottage cheese and wild garlic.
- Chudu (Чуду) — Sort of pie, made in Dagestan with various fillings (meat, cheese, cottage cheese, herbs, etc.).
- Dalnash (Далнаш) — Chechen and Ingush pie filled with lard and wild garlic.
- Lahmajun (լահմաջո) — Armenian baked flatbread topped with minced meat, spices, herbs, minced vegetables such as garlic, tomatoes, onions, and parsley, then baked. It is of Arabic origin and popular not only in Armenia, but also Arab countries (especially in the Levant and Arabian peninsula), as well as Turkey.
- Haliva (Хьэлжъо) — Circassian triangular fried pie, often filled with Circassian cheese and potatoes.
- Hingalsh (Хингалш) — Chechen and Ingush pie with a half-round shape, filled with pumpkin.
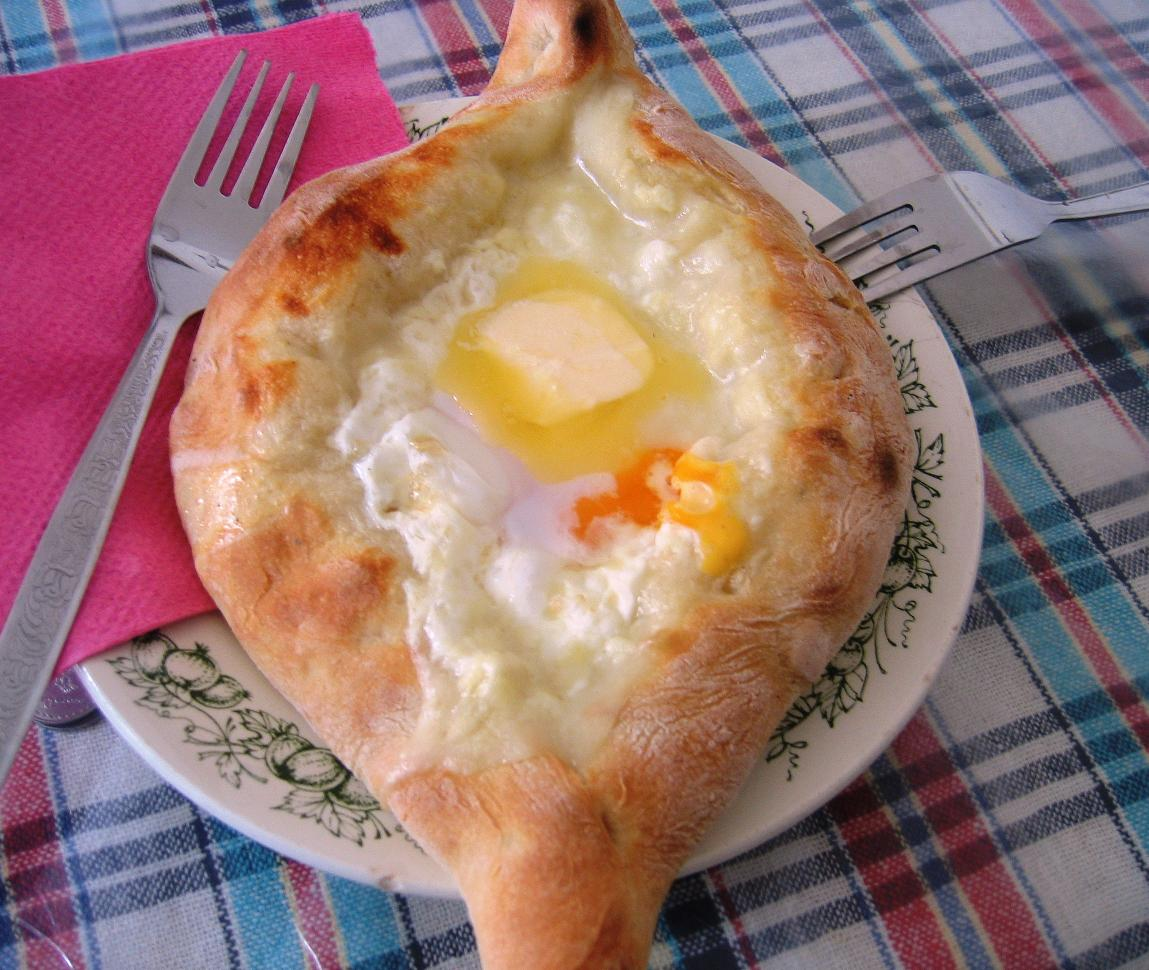
  Adjarian khachapuri
- Khachapuri (ხაჭაპური) — Georgian pie filled with cheese and egg. This dish has a lot of regional variation, the most famous being adjaruli khachapuri, shaped in a form of a boat.
- Kubdari (კუბდარი) — Svan pie filled with spicy meat.
- Khichin (Хычин) — Balkar and Karachay pie filled with various stuffings.
- Byoreks (բյորեկ) — are Armenian triangular pastries made with phyllo pastry and stuffed with either cheese, meat, spinach, herbs, potato, a cheese and spinach mixture, a cheese and herbs mixture, or a potato and cheese mixture.
- Ossetian pies (джин) — These are either filled with a mixture of Ossetian cheese and garlic, cabbage and cheese, potato and cheese, mashed pumpkin, only cheese, minced meat, kidney beans, or beetroot and cheese.
- Qutab — Azerbaijani and Turkmen cooked dough filled with meat or pumpkin.

=== Starters and snacks ===
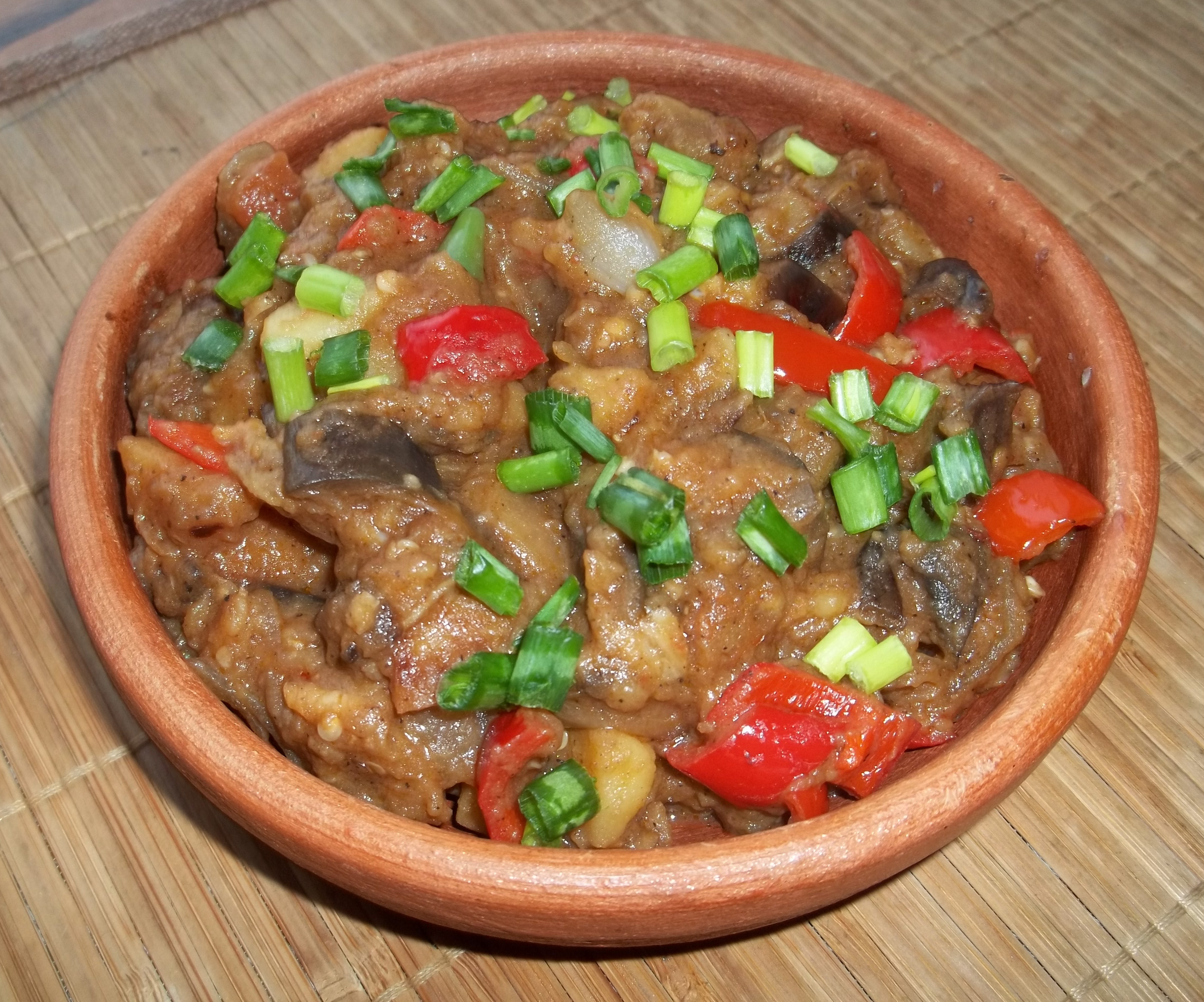
Ajapsandali

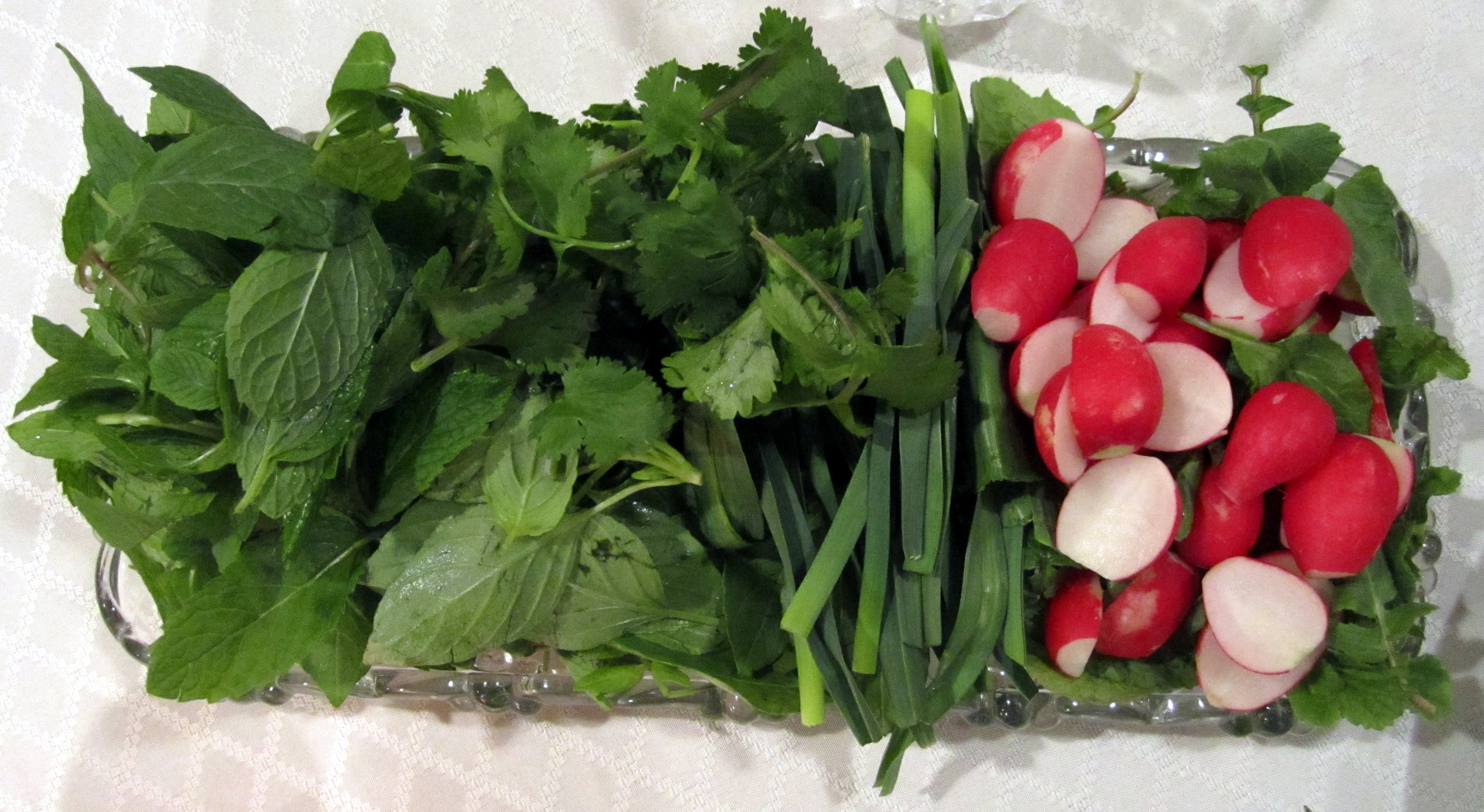
Kanachi, a side-dish consisting of fresh herbs and vegetables

- Ajapsandali (აჯაფსანდალი / Աջափսանդալ) — Cold starter containing aubergines, potatoes and spices. It is traditionally made in Georgia and Armenia.
- Basturma (Բաստուրմա) — Armenian air-dried cured beef coated in a paste made out of an Armenian spice blend chemen, tomato paste and garlic.
- Dolma / Tolma (Dolma / Տոլմա / Tolma / Долма) — Vegetable (cabbage, zucchini, grape leaf, aubergine, pepper) stuffed with minced meat and rice, in the Caucasus, it is mostly made in Armenia and Azerbaijan.
- Ailazan (այլազան) — Armenian appetizer made from stewed vegetables. In some variations of the recipe, meat is also used. The dish is similar to ajapsandal.
- Topik (Թոփիկ) is an Armenian dish, sometimes thought of as a vegetarian meatball, consisting of a chickpea-based paste, usually mixed with potatoes or flour, surrounding a filling of onions, nuts, currants, and flavored with herbs, spices, and tahini, It is a traditional lenten dish.
- Lobio (ლობიო) — Cooked minced beans with addition of coriander, walnuts, garlic and onion.
- Kanachi (կանաչի) — Is an Armenian appetizer consisting of any combination of a set of fresh herbs and raw vegetables. Basil or purple basil, mint, parsley, tarragon, coriander, leek and radishes are among the most common ones. Nowadays, It is not only popular in Armenia, but is also becoming popular in Azerbaijan.
- Nigvziani Badrijani (ნიგვზიანი ბადრიჯანი) — Fried aubergine with walnut sauce and pomegranate seeds.
- Eetch (Էտչ) — is a traditional Armenian side dish, salad or spread, similar to tabbouleh. This bulgur salads red colour is derived from crushed or pureed tomatoes. Common additional ingredients include onion, parsley, olive oil, lemon, paprika, bell peppers and spices.
- Pkhali (ფხალი) — Minced vegetables (cabbage, beet, aubergine) with pomegranate seeds.
- Chi kofta (չի քյուֆթե) — A type of kofta, It is a raw bulgur-based dish mixed with tomato paste, pomegranate molasses, spices, and sometimes meat. It is served with lavash, kanachi (fresh herbs), salad, and often pomegranate molasses or grape syrup. It is popular amongst Turks and Armenians.
- Sujuk (Սուջուխ / Sucuk) — Dry and spicy sausage, mostly made in Armenia and Azerbaijan.
- Brduch(բրդուճ) — A type of wrap made by filling bread (mostly lavash) with Armenian cheeses, walnuts, herbs (herbs used for kanachi) and condiments (ajika, lecho, pomegranade molasses, grape syrup).
- Loligov dzvadzekh or Pamidorov dzvadzekh (լոլիգով ձվաձեխ; պամիդորով ձվաձեխ) — A common appetizer and breakfast-dish in Armenia. Essentially a scramble with tomato as the base. This dish also includes onions, bell peppers, garlic and herbs (tarragon, purple basil, and coriander). It is usually served with lavash bread. A variation of this dish adds Armenian cheeses to the dish.

=== Soups and stews ===
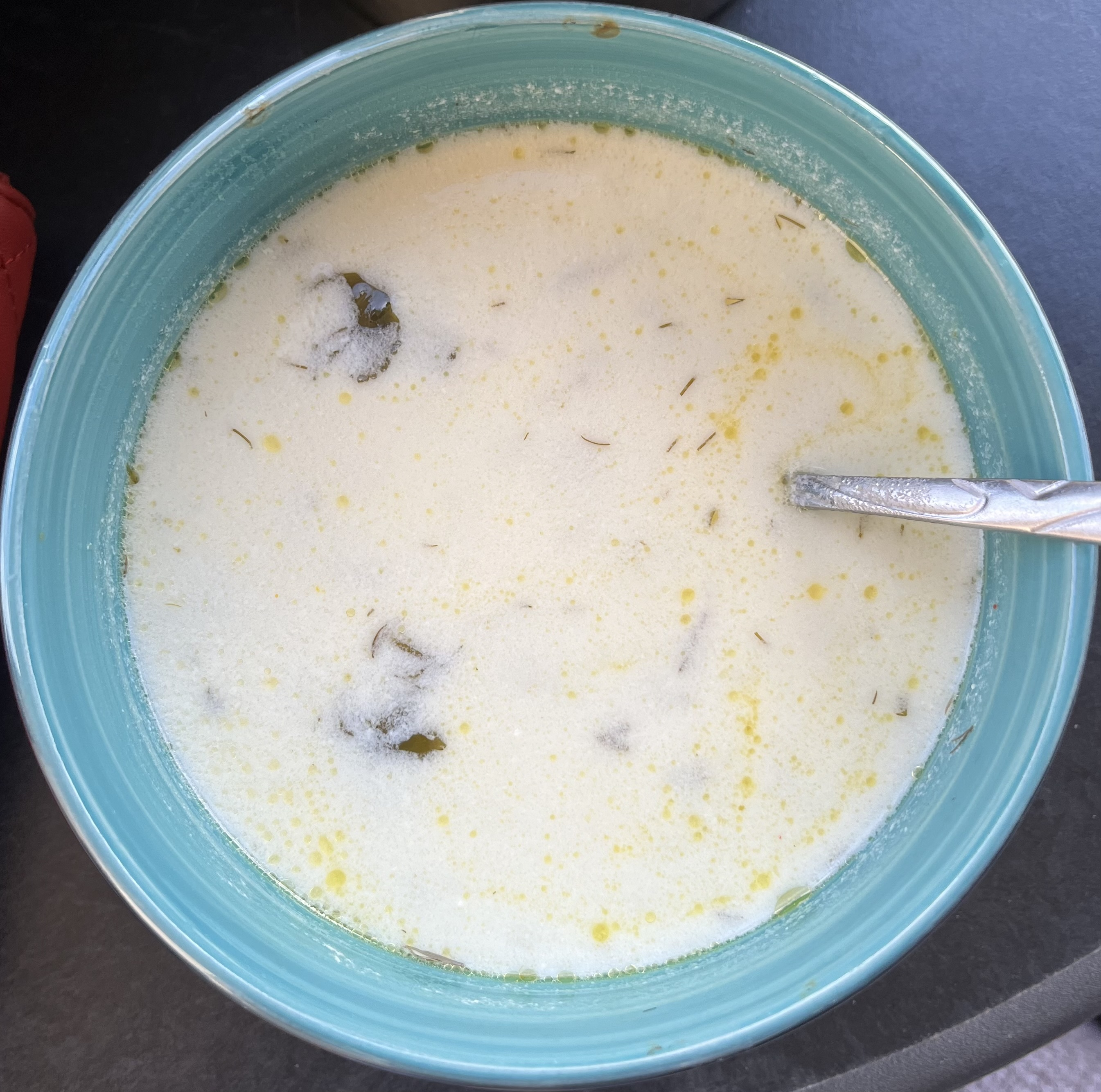
Armenian spas soup

- Spas (Սպաս) — Armenian soup made with matzoon. Flour, egg or egg yolk, herbs, such as coriander, thyme, parsley, and mint, are added as well. Butter and regular onions, or fried onions are often added to the soup for a richer taste. It can also be served with meatballs.
- Bugleme (Буглеме) — Meat stew, served by the Mountain Jews.
- Mantapour (մանթապուր) — is an Armenian soup made by combining meat-filled manti, matzoon, sour cream, and broth.
- Chakapuli (ჩაქაფული) — Stew made of lamb or beef (or veal), tarragon and cherry plums in Eastern Georgia (Kakheti and Kartli).
- Nraneh (նռանեհ) — Armenian soup made of slow‑cooked lamb in a broth that features pomegranate juice, or pomegranate molasses and herbs. It sometimes includes rice and is garnished with coriander and tarragon.
- Qovurma — Azerbaijani lamb stew.
- Aveluk soup (ավելուկի ապուր) — Armenian soup made of aveluk (sorrel), onion, garlic, oil or butter, salt, black pepper, lemon juice or vinegar, dried herbs like thyme or mint and sometimes bulgur or rice.
- Chakhokhbili (ჩახოხბილი) — Soup made of tomatoes and poultry meat (mostly chicken or turkey) which originated in Western Georgia.
- Arganak (արգանակ) — Armenian soup consisting of meatballs, rice, onions, chicken broth, lemon juice, yolk, and parsley.
- Chikhirtma (ჩიხირთმა) — Soup made of turkey or chicken meat and eggs which is traditionally made in Kakheti.
- Karshm (կարշմ) — Armenian soup made in the town of Vaik in the Vayots Dzor Province. It is a walnut-based soup with red beans, green beans, chickpeas and spices. It is garnished with red pepper and garlic.
- Dovga (Dovğа) — Soup made of yoghurt and fresh herbs, traditionally made in Azerbaijan.
- Vospapour (ոսպապուր) — Armenian lentil soup made with brown lentils cooked in broth together with chickpeas, carrots, celery, coarse bulgur, ground walnuts and puréed dried fruits (especially apricot). It is flavoured with fried onions, mint, parsley, and cumin. Variations also include spices and ingredients like cayenne pepper, cinnamon, tomatoes, eggplants, spinach, and ground walnuts.
- Kharcho (ხარჩო) — Soup made of beef, rice, cherry plums and walnuts from Mingrelia.
- Krchik (Քրճիկ) — soup made from pickled cabbage, onions, potatoes, tomato purée, cracked wheat, potatoes, coriander, parsley, butter, black pepper, and salt.

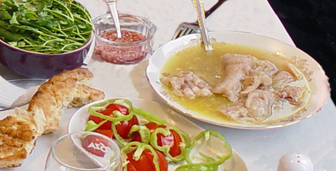
Armenian khash

- Khash (խաշ) — beef or lamb feet in its broth with garlic. It originated in Armenia and is eaten throughout the Caucasus.
- Chanakhi (ჩანახი) — Georgian tomato-based stew with spiced lamb, potatoes, aubergines.
- Piti / Putuk (պուտուկ) — Azerbaijani and Armenian soup made with mutton, tail fat, chickpeas, potato, onions, dried alycha and sumac.
- Khashlama (Խաշլամա) — Armenian stew made with large chunks of meat, usually lamb, beef, or veal that are simmered slowly with vegetables in a pot. The meat is not browned or fried; instead, it is cut into pieces and layered raw in a pot with slices of onions, tomatoes (or tomato paste), bell peppers, and sometimes potatoes or carrots. Garlic, bay leaves, salt, and whole black peppercorns are added for flavor.
- Bozbash (Bozbaş/բոզբաշ) – a mutton and lamb soup that exists in Azerbaijan and Armenia with the addition of different vegetables. There is a special kind of bozbash served in Armenia. It is named Shoushin bozbash (Armenian: շուշին բոզբաշ), and is made from lamb, quince, apple, and mint. This variation of bozbash is "practically unknown outside of Armenia".
- Gomgush (ղամղուշ) — is an Armenian banquet stew consisting of summer squash, tomato sauce, prunes, garlic, mint, chickpeas, sevan trout, pumpkin, matzoon, pepper paste, and dill. It is usually cooked inside a tonir.
- Chorba — Types of soup usually made with lamb and beef, fried vegetables and herbs which is made in every country in Caucasus, especially in Dagestan and Azerbaijan.
- Tarhana (Թարխանա) — Soup made with matzoon and flour.

=== Main courses ===
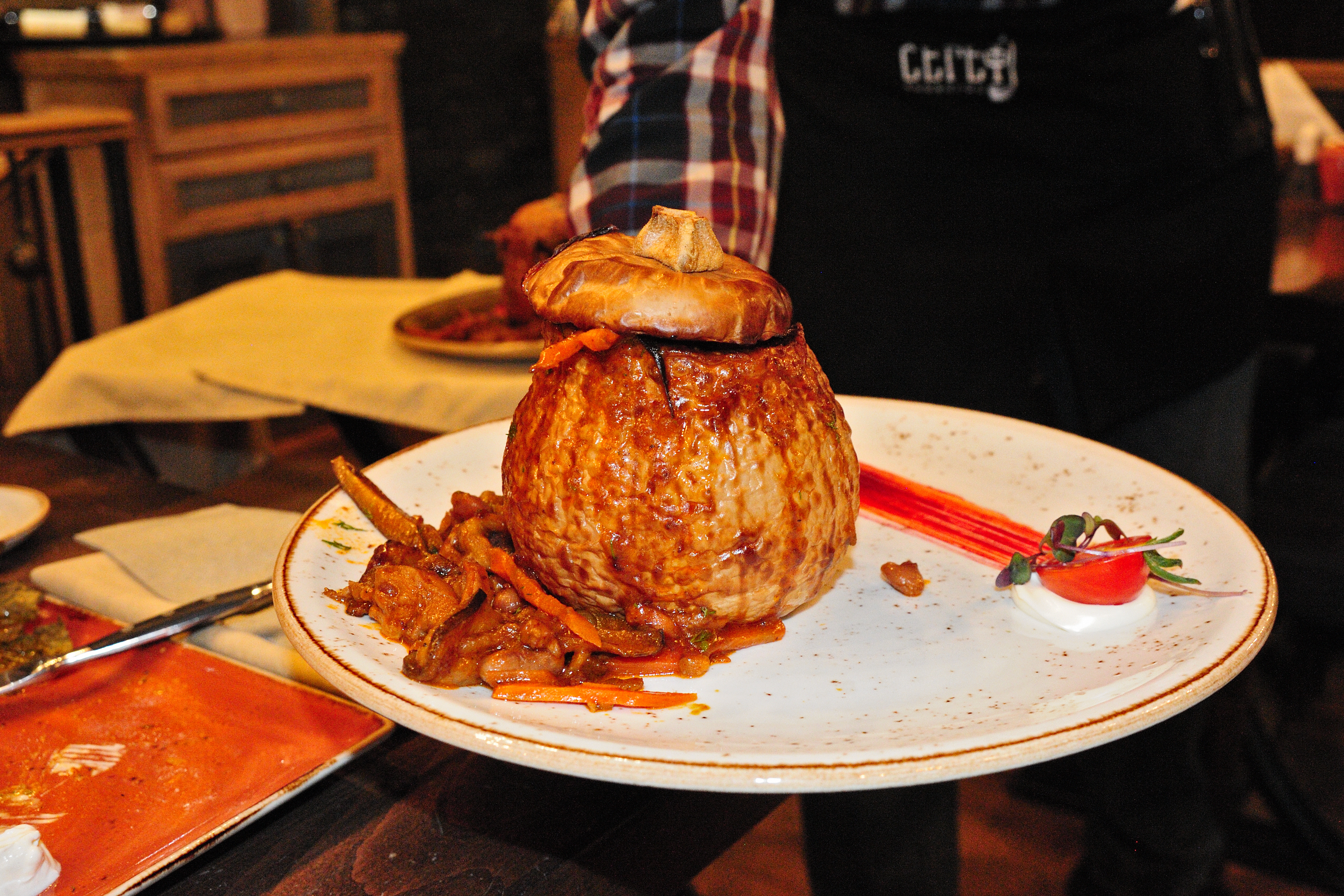
Armenian ghapama in a restaurant

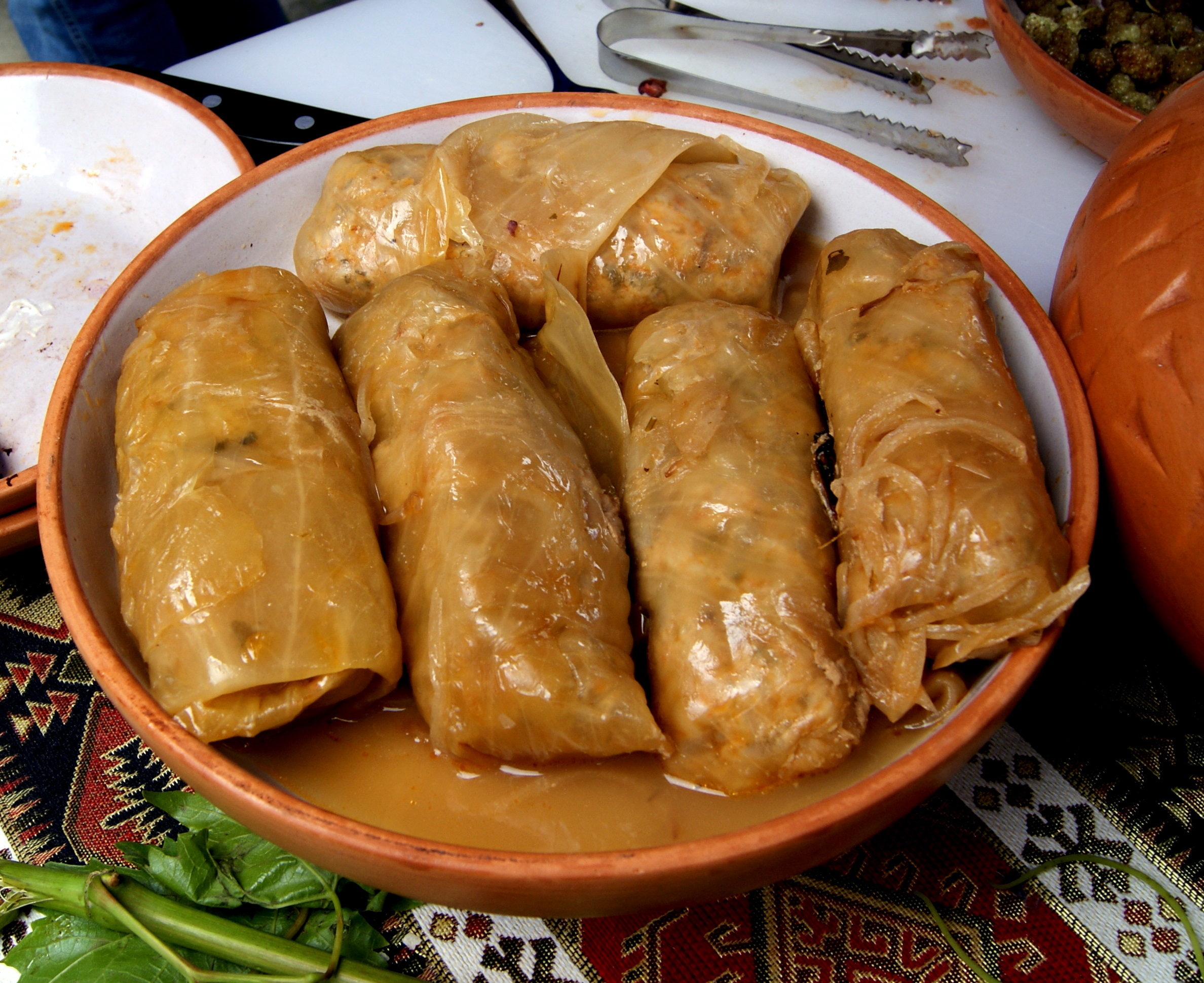
Vine leaf dolma, one of the most popular variations of dolma

- Ghapama (Ղափամա) – Armenian baked pumpkin filled with either rice, dried fruits, honey and spices, or in the savory version, with rice, meat, onions, herbs and spices.
- Apkhazura (აფხაზურა) — Fried meat enrolled in caul fat, traditionally made in Abkhazia.
- Stuffed intestines (փոր լցոնած or դալակ դոլմա) — Armenian dish consisting of intestines stuffed with minced meat, bulgur, dried mint, onion, chickpeas, salt, black pepper, allspice, and cinnamon.
- Amcheg (Амчег) — Lezgin roasted turkey.
- Dolma / Tolma (Dolma / Տոլմա / Долма) — Vegetable (cabbage, zucchini, grape leaf, aubergine, pepper, onion, sorrel leaf), or fruit (apple, quince, melon, tomato) stuffed with minced meat, rice, spices and herbs, of Turkic origin that is popular in Armenia and Azerbaijan.
- Barsh (БӀарш) — Chechen and Ingush dish, consisting of a mutton stomach stuffed with minced meat.
- Khurjin (խուրջին) — Armenian dish named after a traditional saddlebag, reflecting its distinctive pouch-like shape. Resembling an oversized khinkali when only focusing on Its looks, it is made by filling a round sheet of thin dough with grilled meat, vegetables, herbs and spices, then gathering and twisting the edges at the top to seal it like a bundle. The khurjin is then baked until golden, holding in all the juices. When served, it is often sliced open to reveal the steaming filling inside.
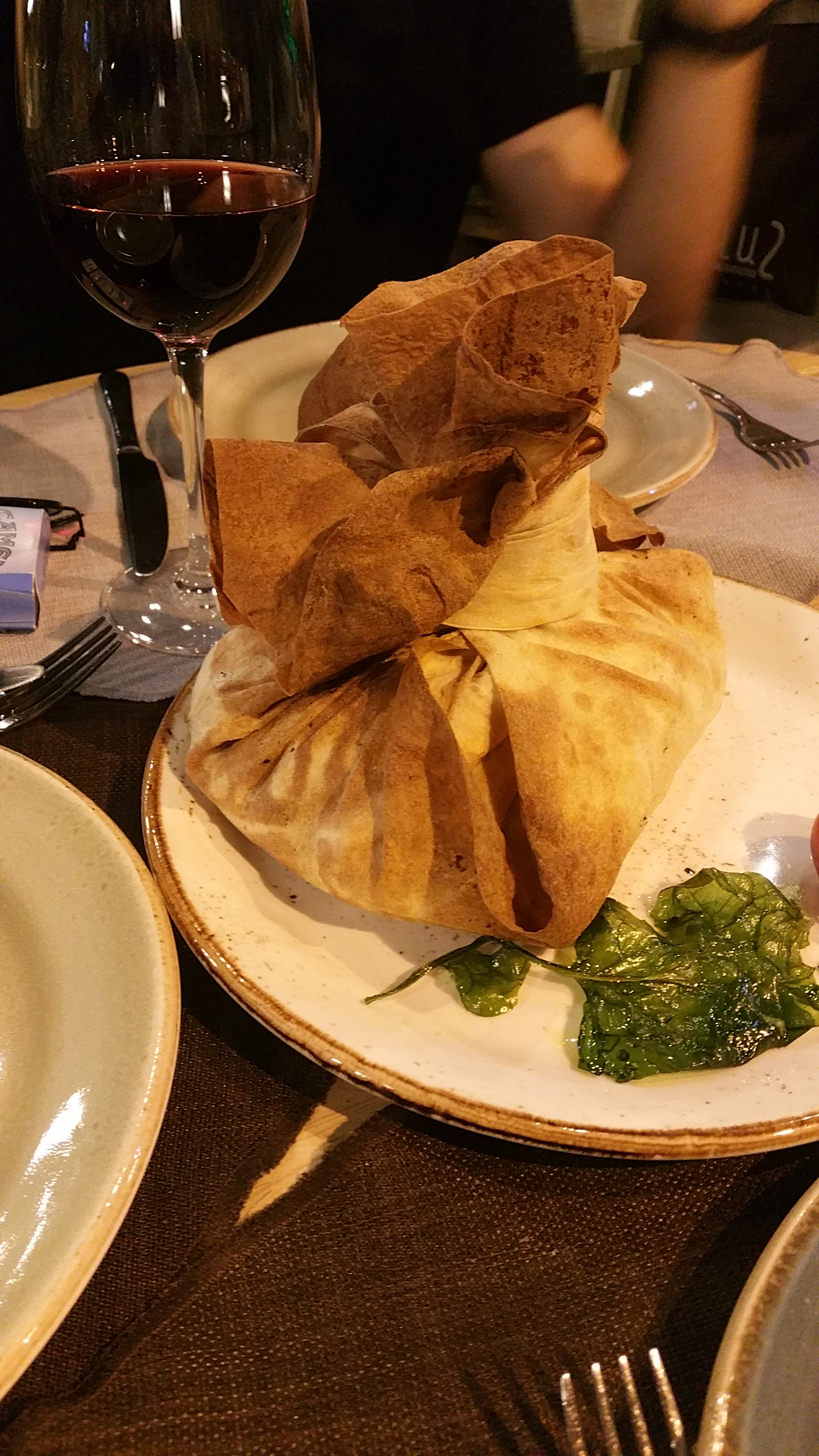
  Armenian khurjin served at a restaurant

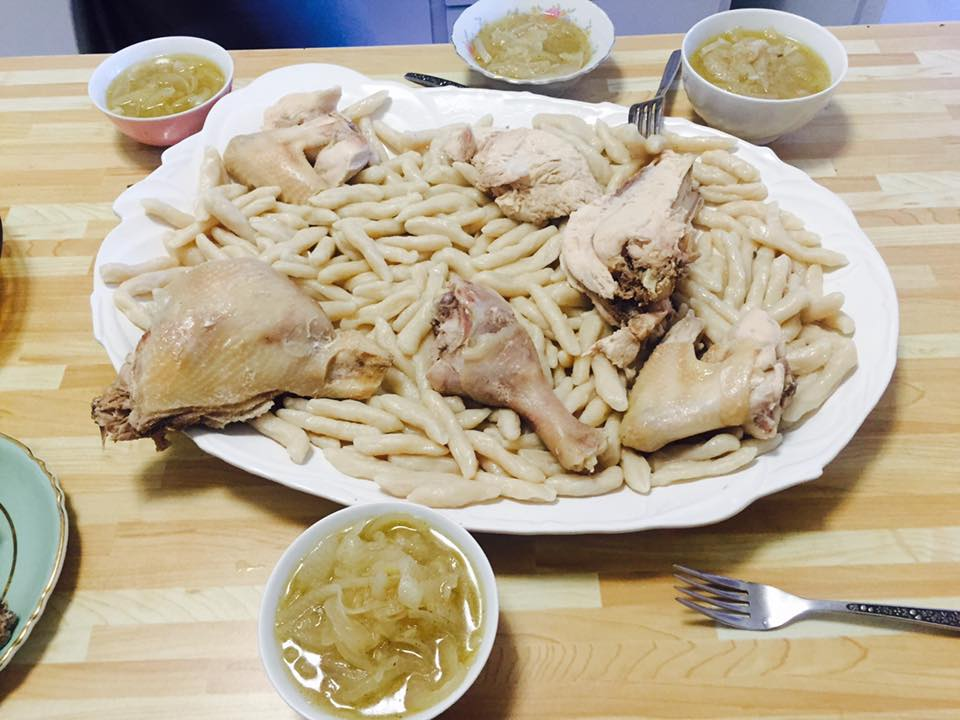
Jijig-Galnash

- Tabaka Qatami (ტაბაკა ქათამი) — Georgian roasted chicken with adjika, traditionally made in Mingrelia.
- Plov (Plov / Փլավ / ფლავი / Плов) — Rice dish, mostly cooked with meat and vegetables.
- Karmir pilaf (կարմիր փիլավ) — Armenian red rice dish made with butter, rice, onions, herbs, spices (especially sumac), tomato paste and sometimes meat. The word karmir means "red" in Armenian, referring to the red colour of the dish.
- Dzhed (Джед) — Circassian chicken in a sauce, similar to satsivi.
- Amich(Ամիչ) — Armenian dish made with poultry, typically turkey or chicken, stuffed with rice, herbs, spices and dried fruits. Historically, it was prepared with pheasant. The dish is mentioned in the 5th-century works of Armenian historians Faustus of Byzantium and Yeghishe.
- Jijig-Galnash (Жижиг-Галнаш) — Chechen and Ingush dish consisting of Galnash (boiled dough) with meat and its broth.
- Khokhob (խոխոբ) — Armenian poultry dish made with either duck (most popular variation), pheasant, chicken, or turkey. The meat is cooked with tart fruits like barberries, apricots, or raisins, kanachi herbs, nuts, and warm spices. Khokhob is often served with vegetables, potatoes, or bread. It is often served in a garlic, walnut and pomegranate sauce.
- Satsivi (საცივი) — Georgian poultry meat (turkey or chicken) based dish with walnut sauce.
- Panrkhash (պանրխաշ) — Armenian dish that consists of lavash bread, cheese, onions, and boiled water. The dish is prepared by layering the chechil and lavash in a ramekin or clay bowl, then adding sautéed onions and hot water before baking the mixture until golden brown.
- Khoyagusht (Хоягушт) — Meat pie from the cuisine of Mountain Jews, Made of eggs, turmeric, slow cooked meat (usually sheep or goat) and its broth.
- Tjvjik (տժվժիկ) — Armenian dish made from offal (mostly liver), fried with onions and optionally tomato purée. It is simmered until tender and served with parsley.
- Kofta (Küftə / Քուֆթա / გუფთა) — Spiced meatballs, made in Transcaucasia.
- Kchuch (Կճուճ) — Armenian dish made of vegetables, spices, herbs (mostly garlic), tail fat, meat and/or fish. It is served with lavash and turshi.
- Kuchmachi (კუჭმაჭი) — Fried chicken livers with pomegranate seeds.
- Kyalla (քյալլա) — Armenian dish from Gyumri, made by slow-cooking a cleaned sheep or cow head, often in a tonir, until the meat becomes tender. The cooked meat and skin are chopped, seasoned with spices, as well as herbs and placed in the head. The dish is then served with garlic, torshi and lavash.
- Khali-Nukun (ХIали-Нукьун) — Dargin dish consisting of a fat-tailed lards with oatmeal.
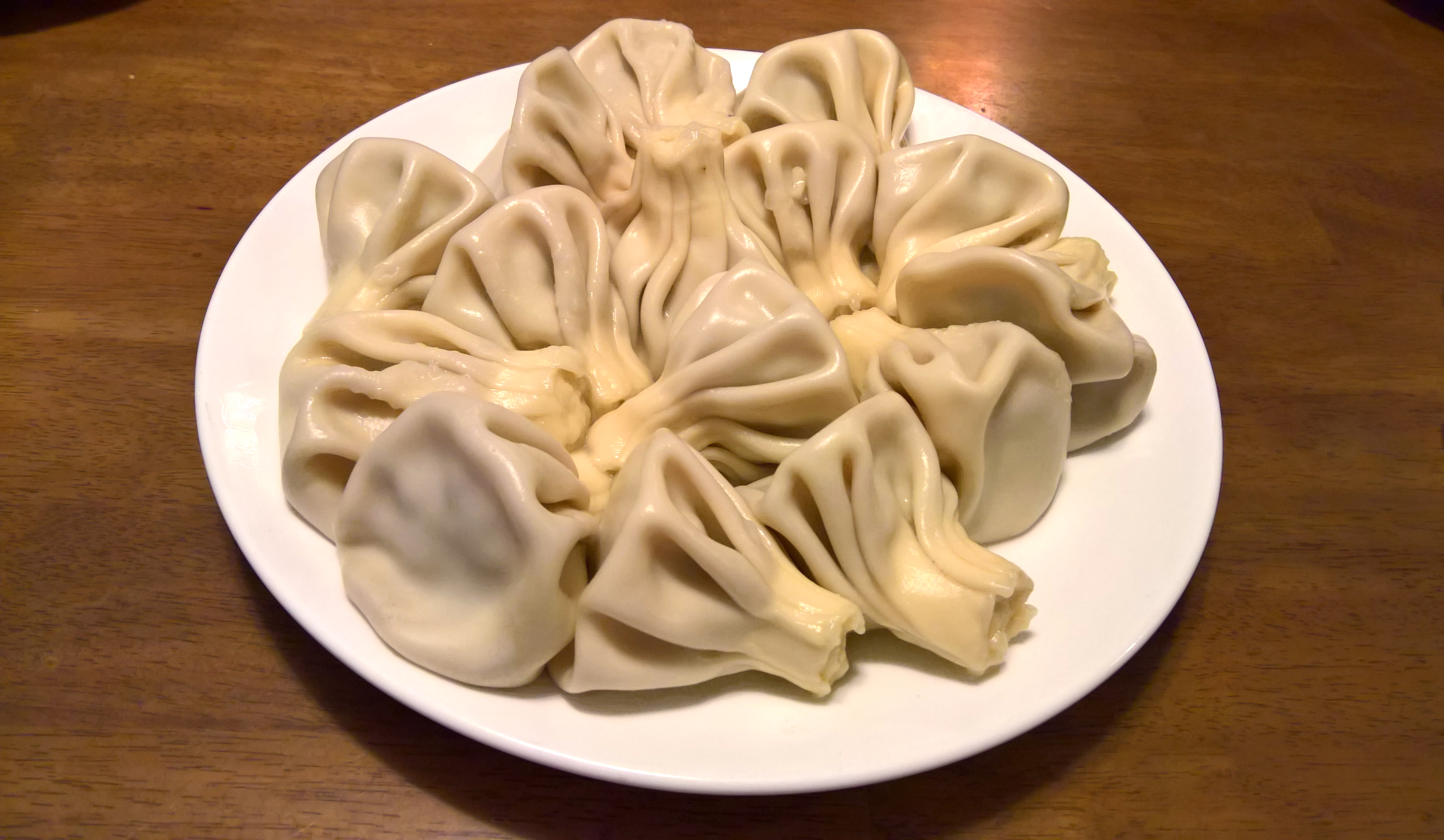
  Khinkali
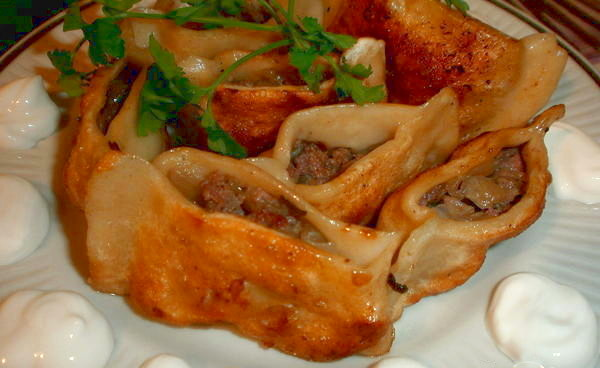
  Armenian boraki
- Khinkali (ხინკალი) — Georgian dumpling stuffed with meat, vegetables or cottage cheese.
- Boraki (Բորակի) — Armenian dumplings typically filled with spiced ground meat and onions, wrapped in thin dough, and often baked, or fried. Boraki are formed as small cylinders with an open top, the cylinders are lightly boiled in broth and then baked, or fried. Thed usually sit in an Armenian sauce called lecho, which consists of bell peppers, tomatoes, onions, garlic, oil, salt, hot peppers and sometimes vinegar. Boraki are served garnished with matzoon and chopped garlic.
- Joshpara (جوش‌پَرَ/Düşbərə) - Small Iranian, Turkic and Azerbaijani dumplings served with mutton and vegetables in its broth.
- Manti (Manti), (մանթի) — Dumplings popular in the Caucasus that are usually served with herbs and spoces infused matzoon or sour cream (ttvaser), garlic and lecho, or another tomato based sauce.
- Holtmash (ХьолтӀмаш) — Chechen and Ingush dumplings made from cornmeal stuffed with nettles.
- Gürzə — Azerbaijani dumplings.
- Kurze (Курзе) — Long shaped dumplings stuffed with meat, popular among Dagestanis.
- Mataz (Мэтазэ) — Circassian dumplings stuffed with various fillings (meat, cottage cheese, potato).

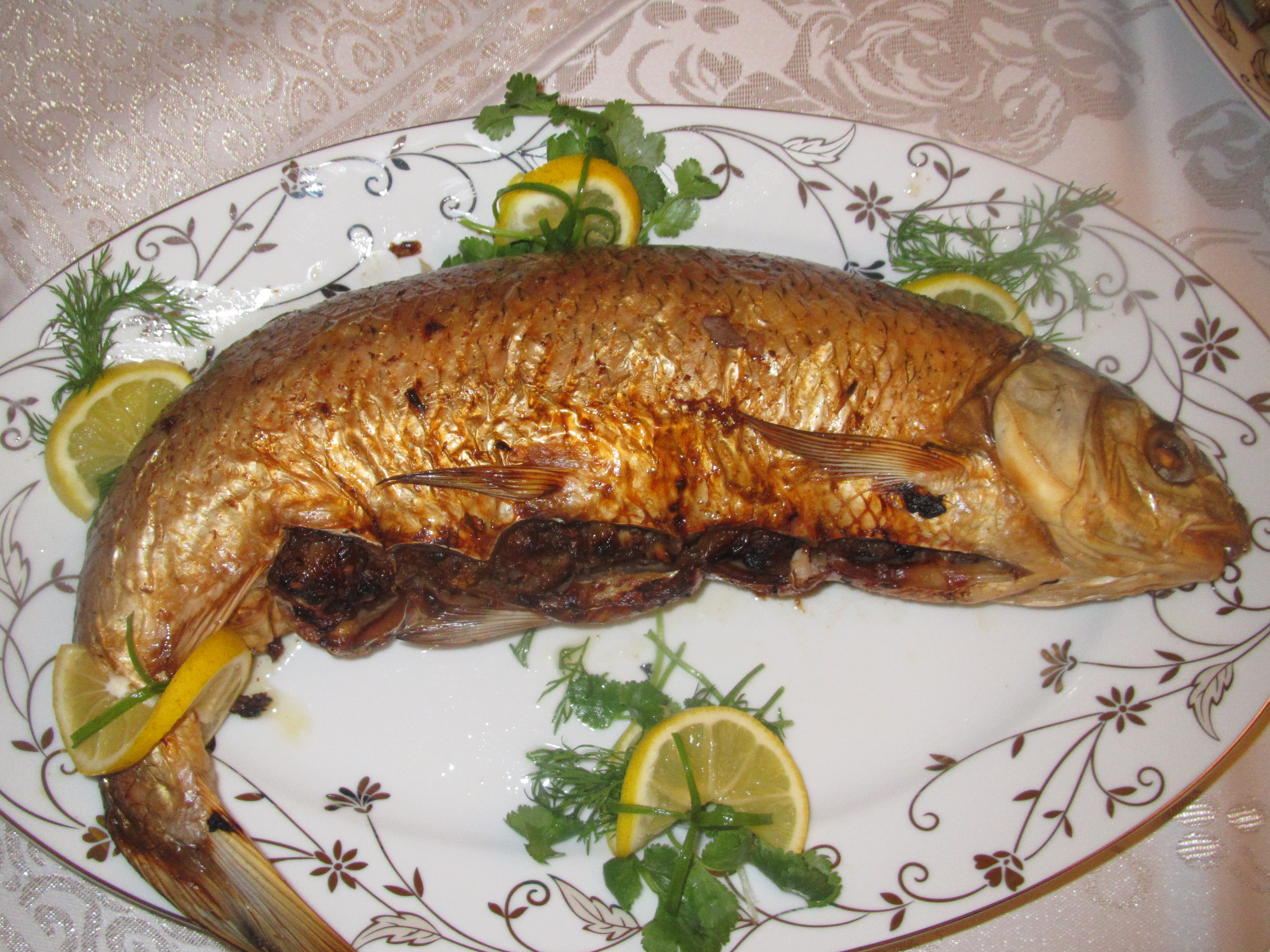
Fish based Levengi

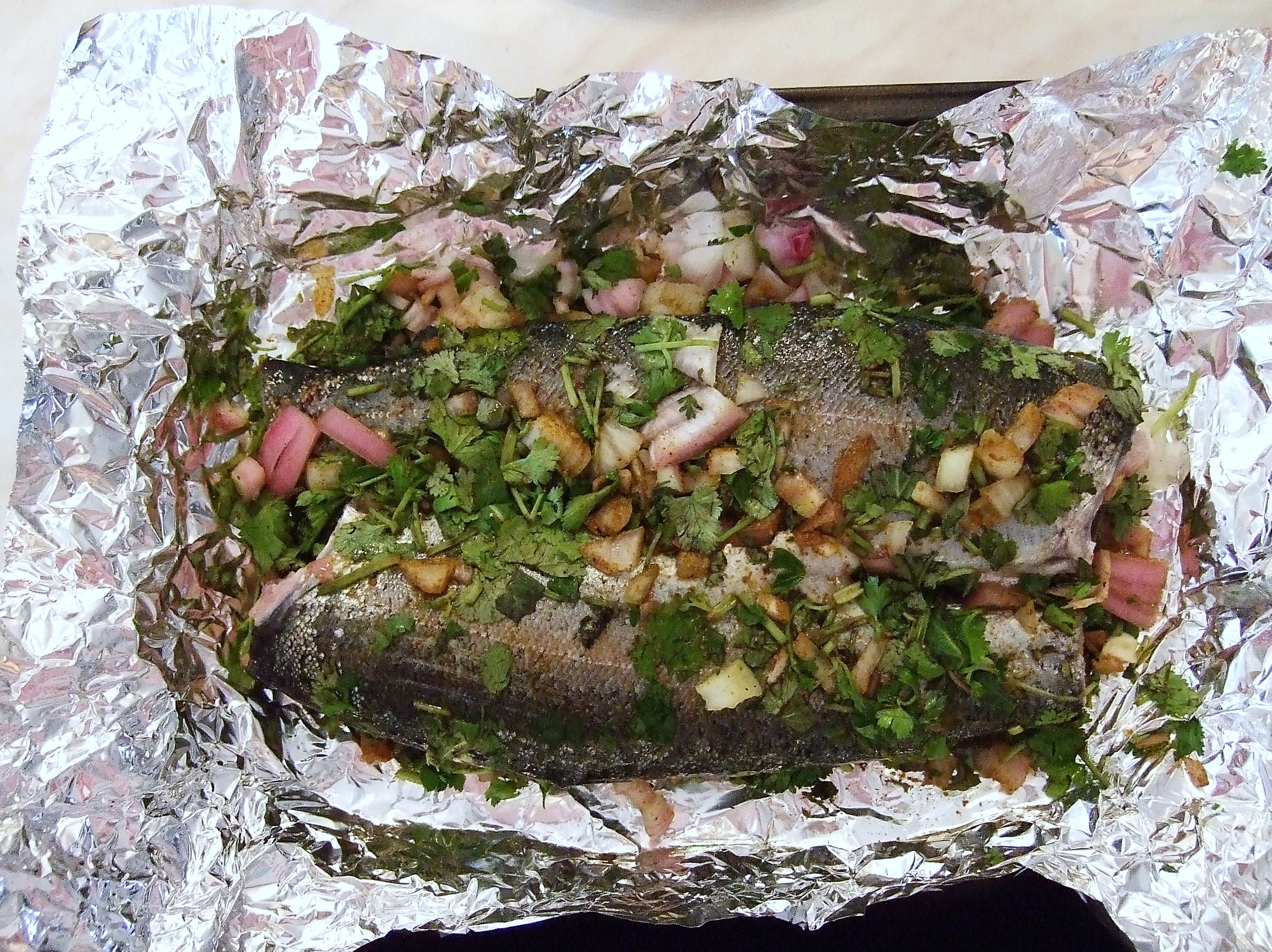
Marinated sevan trout ready to be grilled

- Lavangi (Ləvəngi/Ləvəngi) — Azerbaijani and Talysh baked chicken or fish stuffed with walnuts and spices.
- Stuffed mussels (Լցոնած միդիա, or Միդիա տոլմա) — Armenian dish consisting of mussels stuffed with rice or bulgur, herbs and spices.
- Ishkan and Koghak (իշխան; կողակ) — Two fish native to the Armenian lake of Sevan. They are prepared in various ways. One of them is cooking them in oil, another way is cooking them in wine. It also can be barbecued like khorovats, used in stews (as a variation of khashlama), used to make fish balls, used to be fried, used to be baked and used to be grilled.
- Sig kebab (սիգ քյաբաբh) — Armenian kebab made out of the minced meat of the sig fish, herbs and spices. It is often served with lavash, vegetables and herbs like onions, parsley, purple basil and tarragon.
- Stuffed ishkan / Stuffed mackerel (լցոնած իշխան/լցոնած սկումբրիա) — Armenian dish consisting of either sevan trout, or mackerel stuffed with apricots, almonds, hazelnuts, pine nuts, walnuts, cinnamon, cloves, allspice, ginger, fresh herbs (tarragon and thyme), and lemon juice.
- Balıq — Turkic grilled fish (commonly sturgeon).
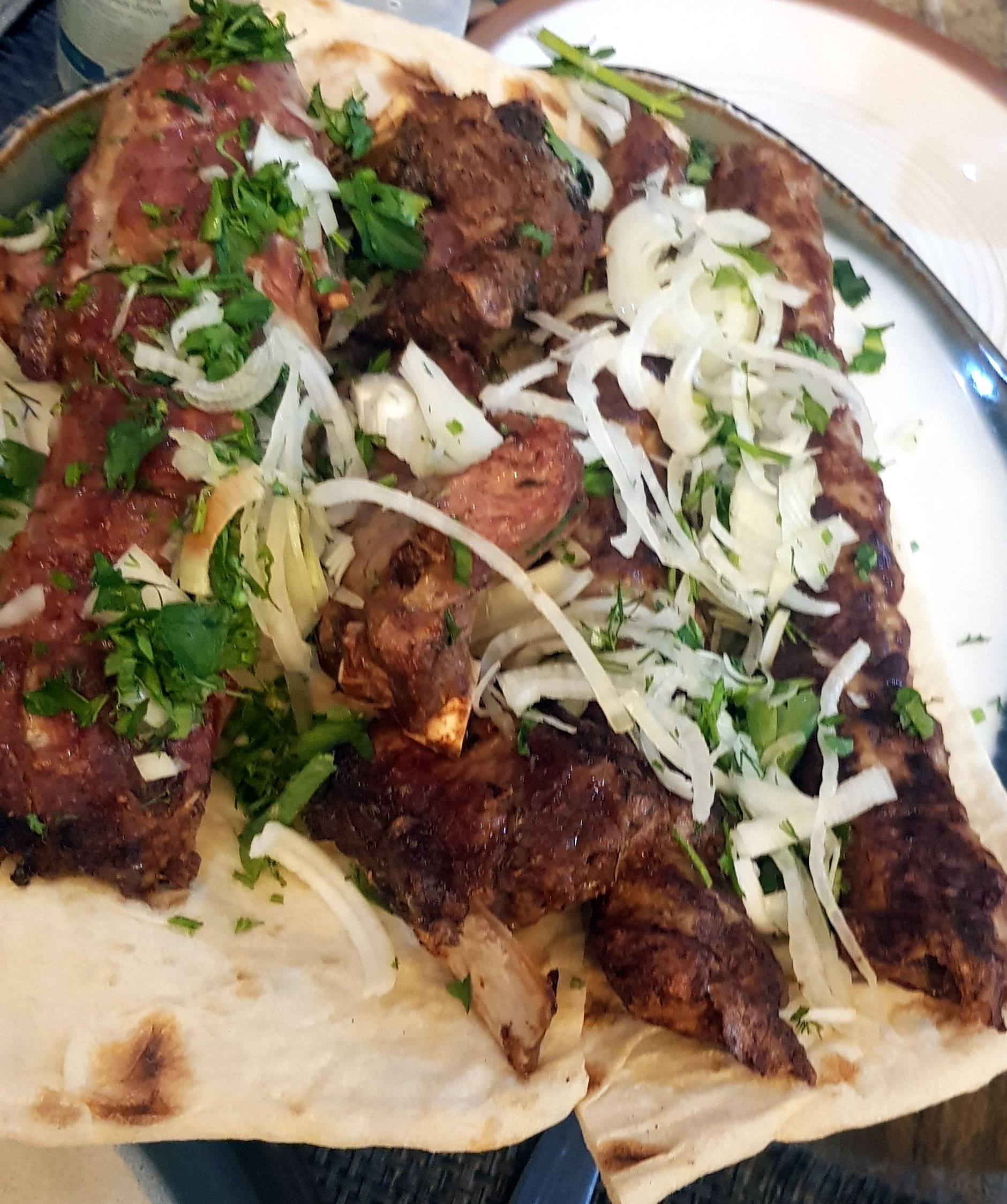
  Armenian khorovats and kebab served with lavash, onions and herbs in Gyumri
- Khorovats (խորոված) — Armenian barbecue can be made with lamb, pork, beef, chicken, fish, or veal. A typical khorovats is made of marinaded chunks of meat grilled on a shampoor (skewer) inside of a tonir. When finished, It is served alongside Armenian side-dishes, like lavash, kanachi, herbs, vegetables and more.
- Lula kebab (լուլա քյաբաբ/Lülə Kabab) — Azerbaijani and Armenian kebab made from minced meat, onion, sheep tail fat, salt, pepper, and sumac. It is often enrolled kn lavash with kanachi herbs, onions and condiments.
- Msho kebab (մշո քեբաբ) — Armenian kebab from the historical mush region, that is made from minced lamb or beef mixed with onion, garlic, black pepper, paprika, allspice and cumin. Parsley and mint are also used in its preparation. It is grilled and served with lavash, condiments, as well as grilled vegetables and kanachi herbs.
- Shashlik/Mtsvadi — Cooked meat on fire, made in all of the Caucasus.
- Losh kebab (լոշ քյաբաբ) — Armenian-style grilled meat patty made from ground beef or lamb, grated onion, parsley, salt, black pepper, and sometimes paprika, as well as aleppo pepper. It is shaped into round patties and grilled, often served with lavash, grilled vegetables, fresh herbs (kanachi), and matzoon.
- Yokh (Йоьхь) — Chechen and Ingush spicy sausage from mutton and flour.
- Bumbar (բումբառ) — Armenian sausage made out of intestines filled with minced meat, onions, spices and in some variations chickpeas, or even rice. It is often seasoned with allspice, cinnamon, black pepper and salt.
- Kupati (კუპატი) — Sausage made in Western Georgia.
- Matagh (մատաղ) — is a lamb or a rooster slated for slaughter as thanksgiving to God. The meat is to be prepared in a simple way stove top with minimal spices.

=== Condiments and sauces ===
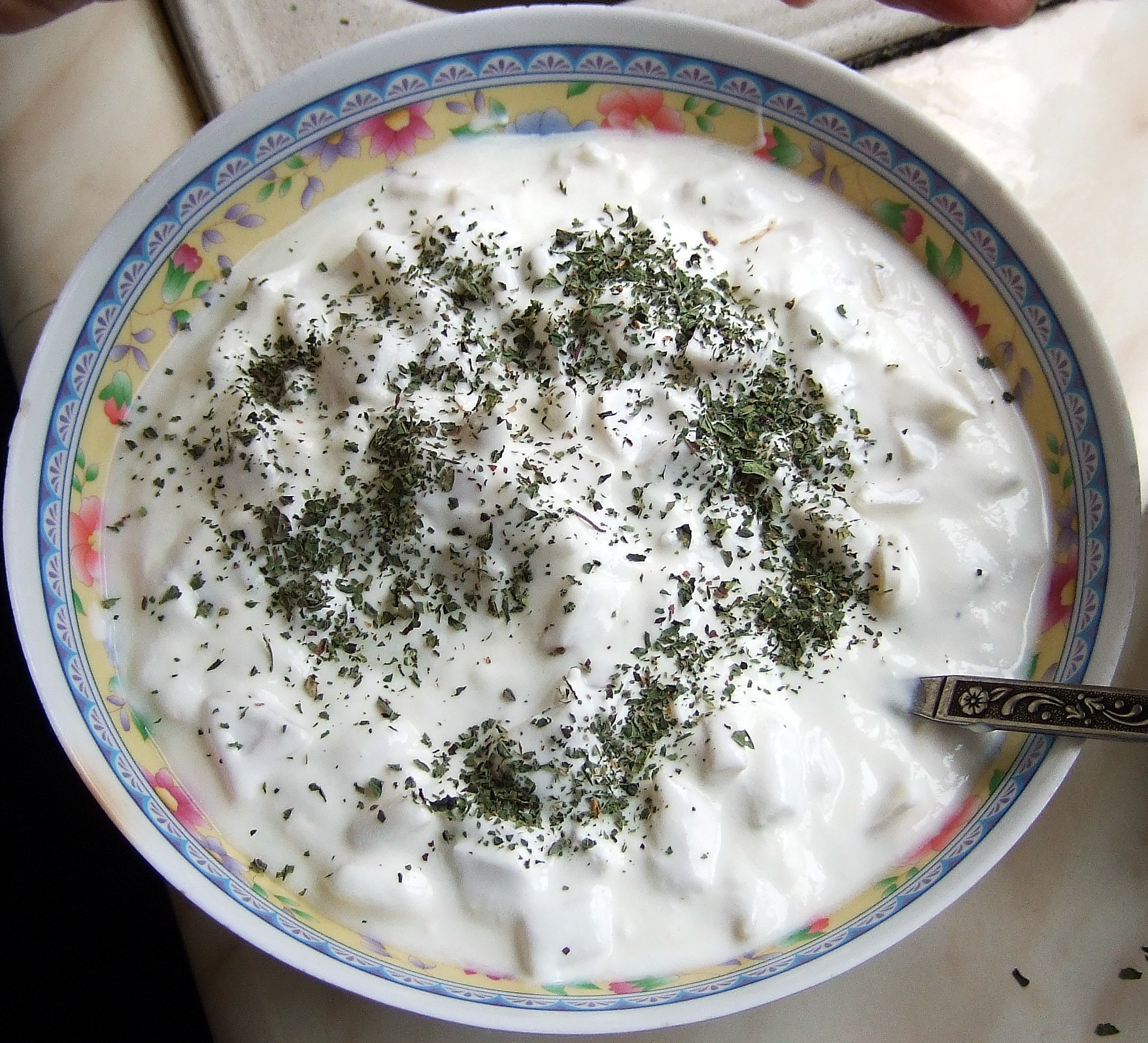
Armenian matzoon with herbs

- Ajika (აჯიკა / Аџьыка) — Spicy paste made from peppers, garlic, herbs, spices, walnuts and salt. It originated in Western Georgia, in the regions of Mingrelia and Abkhazia, but it is used in almost all regions of the Caucasus.
- Grape syrup (դոշաբ / pekmez) — Syrup/molasses made from grapes that is popular in Armenia and Azerbaijan. This syrup is used in multiple foods, like stuffed apples, matzoon, or desserts such as gata and as a medicine.
- Matzoon (Մածուն / მაწონი) — Fermented milk, similar to yoghurt. It is of Armenian origin and consumed in Armenia and Georgia. In Armenia, It is combined with spices and herbs to use it as a standalone condiment.
- Pomegranade molasses (նուռի մածուկ / narşərab / نارشارَب) — Pomegranade-based condiment, made and used in Armenia, Azerbaijan and Iran.
- Ashtarak sauce (Աշտարակի սոուս) — Armenian walnut and garlic sauce from Ashtarak. It is made with walnuts, garlic, vinegar or lemon juice, and salt.
- Bazhe (ბაჟე) — Georgian walnut sauce with spices.
- Mulberry syrup (թութի դոշաբ) — Armenian syrup/molasses made from mulberries and used in multiple dishes.
- Tkemali (ტყემალი) — Georgian cherry plum-based sauce.
- Lecho (լեչո) — is a popular Armenian sauce made from bell peppers, tomatoes, onions, garlic, oil, salt, and sometimes sugar or vinegar.
- Urbech (Урбеч) — Urbech is a Dagestani paste made of ground seeds or nuts.
- Qatik — Fermented milk product popular among Turks.
- Kaymak (սար; սերուցք / კაიმაღი; qaymaq) — Creamy dairy food similar to clotted cream, made from the milk of water buffalo, cows, sheep, or goats. Often used for desserts, It is popular in Armenia, Azerbaijan and Georgia.

=== Breads ===
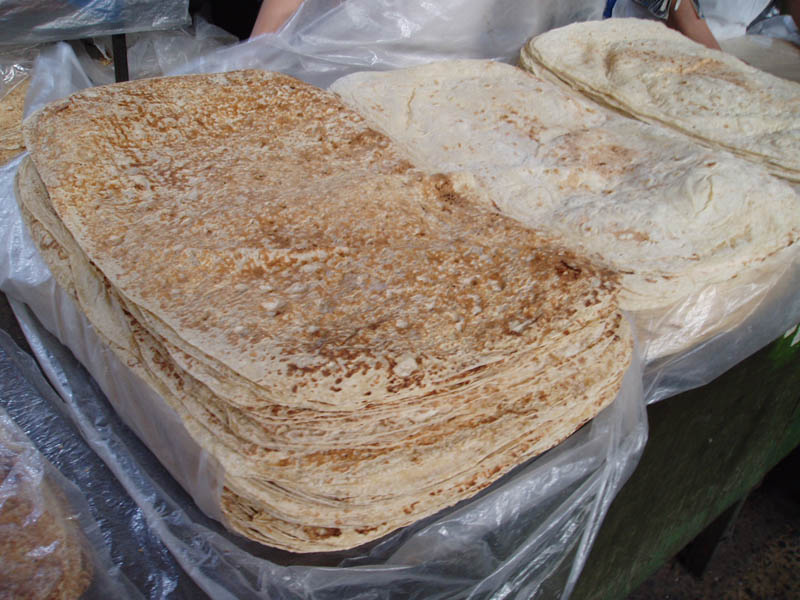
Armenian lavash

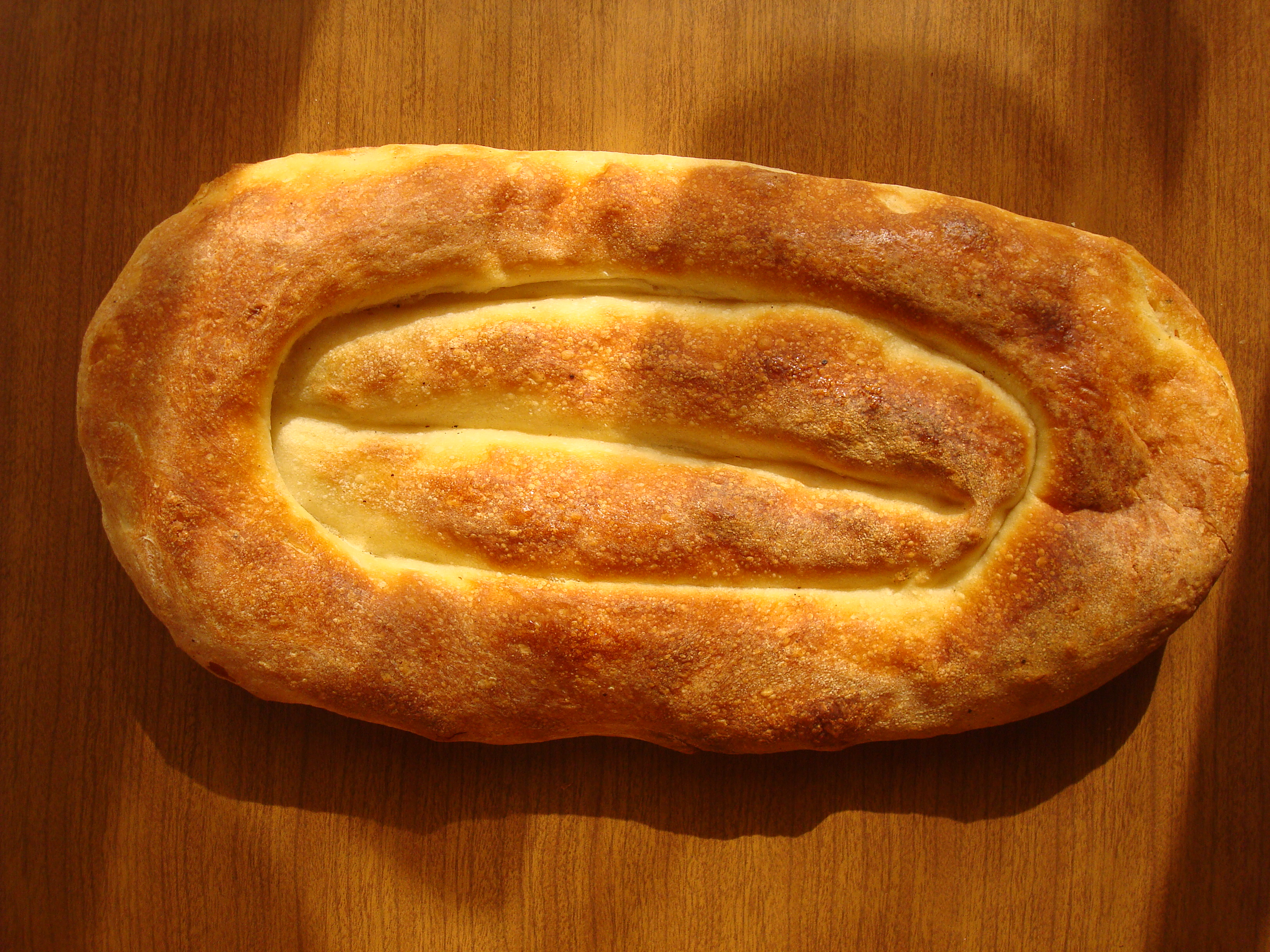
Armenian bread matnakash

- Katnahunts (կաթնահունց) — Sweet and soft braided bread made for Easter. Sometimes filled with chocolate or fruits.
- Matnakash (Մատնաքաշ) — Armenian bread made of wheat flour with yeast or sourdough starter. The characteristic golden-brown color of its crust is achieved by coating the surface of the loaves with sweetened tea essence before baking.
- Lavash (Լավաշ) — Flatbread made in a tonir which is popular in almost every region of the South Caucasus. It is a bread of Armenian origin.
- Mchadi (მჭადი) — Fried bread made from cornmeal.
- Bokon (բոքոն) — Armenian bread with a rhombus shape that has a soft crumb and a hole in the center. Made from leavened dough and brushed with egg white, it is served warm with cheese or herbs.
- Shotis puri (შოთის პური) — Bread shaped like a canoe.
- Bagharj (բաղարջ) — Armenian baked bread product with both ritual and everyday uses. It is sprinkled with sesame, black nigella seeds, or poppy seeds.
- Siskal (Сискал) — Fried bread made from polenta in Ingushetia and Chechnya.
- Nshkhar (նշխար) — Armenian communion bread used during the liturgy (Badarak) in the Armenian Church. It always has a religious (Christian) image printed on top of it.
- Tonis puri (თონის პური) — Popular Georgian bread baked in a tone.
- Tarehats (տարեհաց) — Armenian round bread baked for New Year or Christmas. Made with wheat flour, milk, and butter, it has a hole in the center and is decorated with seeds or fruits. A coin or bean is hidden inside for luck during the holiday cutting.

=== Desserts ===
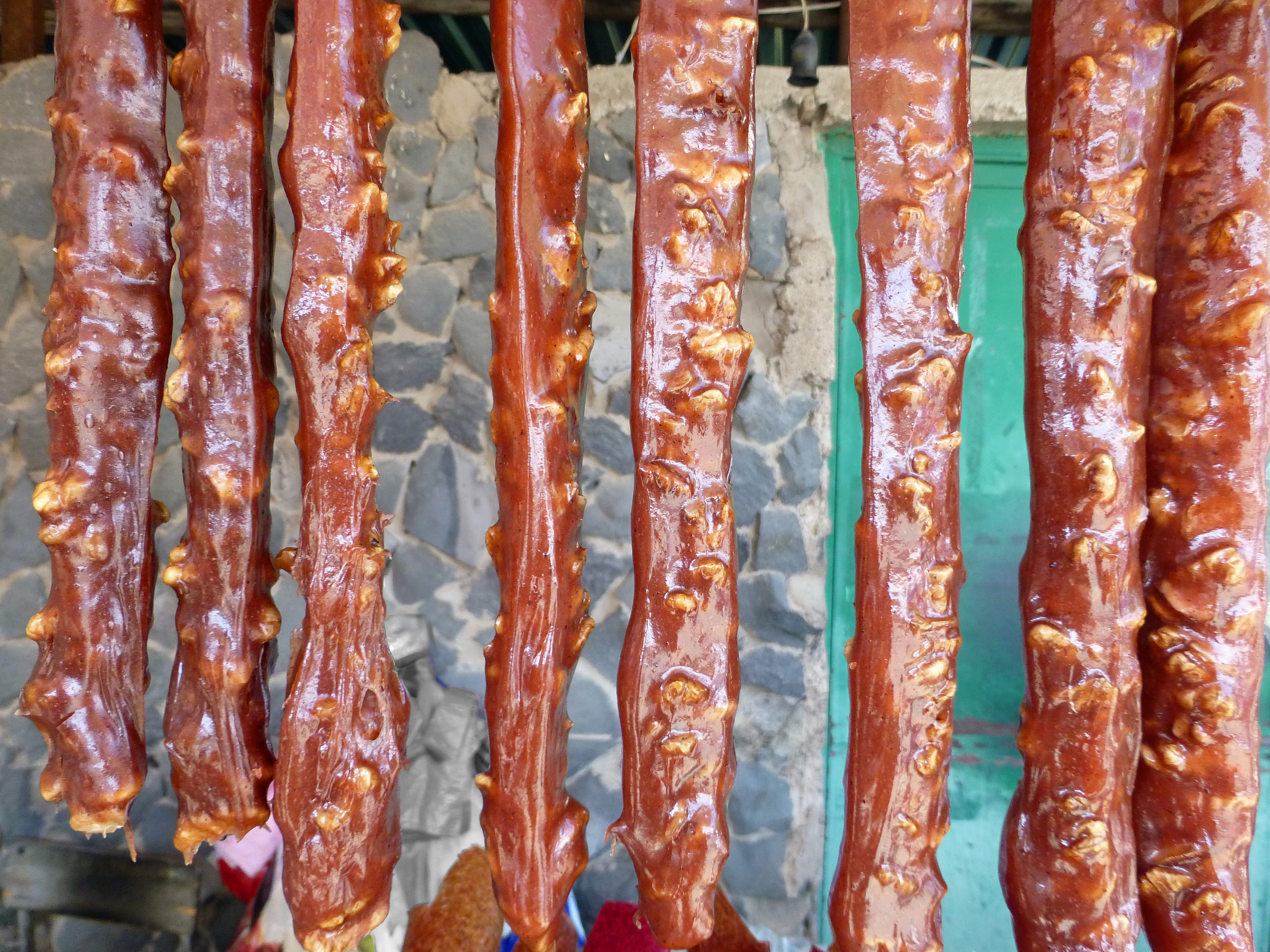
Armenian sharots from Garni

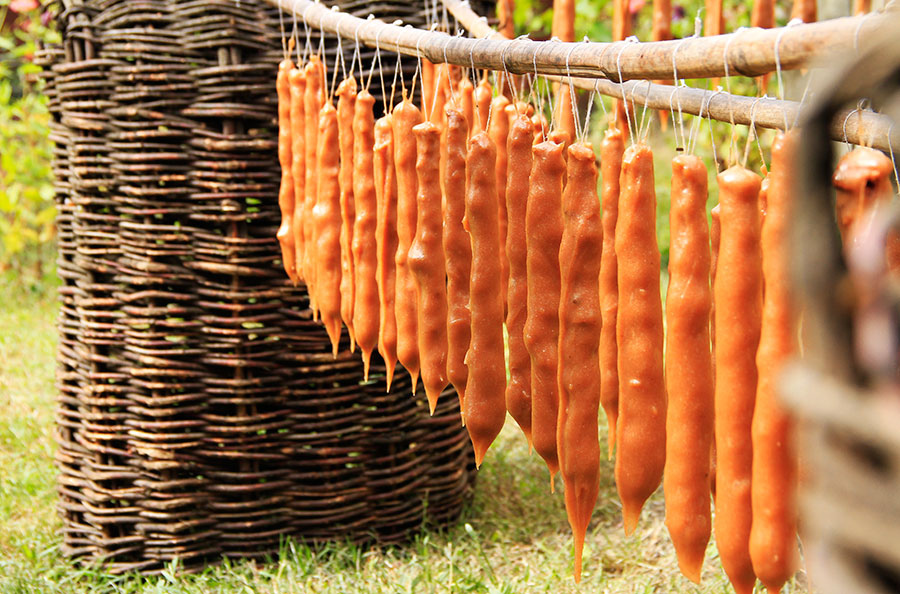
Georgian churchkhela from Kakheti

- Sharots (Շարոց) — a confection in Armenian cuisine, consisting of halved walnut kernels threaded onto a string and coated with a spiced fruit-based mixture.
- Churchkhela (ჩურჩხელა) — Georgian sweet made from mixed grape juice and flour with chopped walnuts or hazelnuts.
- Alani (Ալանի) — Armenian sweet made from dried apricot, or fig stuffed with ground walnut and sometimes sugar.
- Baldzhin (Балджын) — Ossetian sweet pie filled with cherries.
- Gata (Գաթա) — Armenian pastry / sweet bread filled with khoritz a sweet mix made out of sugar, butter and flour. There are many variations to gata. Walnuts, dried fruits and fresh fruits like prunes, apricots, lemons, berries, or apples can also be added to the filling.
- Gozinaki (გოზინაყი) — Sweet made by Georgians for New Year consisting of chopped walnuts and honey.
- Nazook (Նազուկ) — Rolled Armenian pastry filled with khoritz (sugar, butter, sugar) and optionally walnuts, lemons, cranberries, prunes and apricots can be added to the filling.
- Gvaymakkhsh (Гваймакхш) — Chechen / Ingush pancakes with honey.
- Ponchik (պոնչիկ) — Armenian deep-fried piece of dough shaped into a flattened sphere, that turns into a puffed up sphere upon frying, and then becomes a flattened sphere after it is opened. Ponchiks are filled with custard (plain, vanilla or chocolate mostly) and known as Armenian doughnuts.
- Halva (Halva / Հալվա / ჰალვა / Хьовла / Халва) — Sweet made from flour.
- Cigarette cookies (սիգարետ թխվածքաբլիթներ) — Soft Armenian cookies that are rolled into the form of a cigarette. They are filled with either lokhum, a mixture of sugar, cardamom, and walnuts, or a combination of both. The dough mainly consists of matzoon, butter, eggs, and flour. When finished the pastry gets dusted with powdered sugar.
- Harbiz Fo (Хьарбиз фо) — Circassian watermelon honey.
- Mikado cake (միկադո տորթ) — Armenian layer cake made by stacking up layers of baked dough and a buttercream that mainly consists of butter, chocolate, brandy and condensed milk on top of each other. When finished the cake gets covered in the aforementioned buttercream, and shreds of chocolate.
- Murabba (Մուրաբա / მურაბა / Mürəbbə) — Jam made in Transcaucasia with local fruits. It is also made from walnuts in Georgia and Armenia. The most popular fruits and other ingredients turned into murabba in Armenia/Armenian cuisine are watermelon, watermelon rind, quince, pumpkin, apricot, mulberry, raspberry, pear, cherry, cornelian cherry, plum, pomegranate, and walnut.
- Anoushabur (անուշապուր) — Sweet Armenian porridge made from wheat or barley, dried fruits (such as apricots, raisins, and prunes), sugar, spices (like vanilla and cinnamon) and nuts (almonds and pistachios are most common).
- Natyoukh (НатӀюхӀ) — Lak candy made with a mixture of honey and sugar with apricot kernels and walnuts.
- Marlenka (Մառլենկա) — Armenian layered honey cake composed of multiple thin layers of honey-sweetened sponge cake and a filling made from caramel cream. It is typically topped with a dusting of crushed nuts or cocoa-based icing.
- Pakhlava (Paxlava / Փախլավա / ფახლავა) — Sweet pastry made with filo layers, nuts and a syrup. It is made in the Transcaucasian countries, but mostly Armenia and Azerbaijan.
- Rachal (ռաչալ) — Armenian pumpkin dessert. It is essentially candied pumpkin topped with either walnuts, sar, or tahini and powdered sugar.
- Pastegh (Պաստեղ) — Armenian dried fruit leather. Can be served with regular, or sour taste.
- Pelamushi (ფელამუში) — Kakhetian traditional pudding made from grape juice and flour.
- Mrjnabuyn (մրջնաբույն) — Armenian sweet made from crushed nuts and honey or condensed milk mixed with crumbs and shaped into small clusters resembling an ant's nest. It is often covered in chocolate.
- Shekerbura (Şəkərbura) — Azerbaijani sweet pastry filled with almonds, walnuts or hazelnuts. It is consumed during Nowruz, the Zoroastrian New Year.
- Shpot (շփոթ) — Armenian pudding made by boiling fruit juice (usually grape or mulberry) with flour and spices (cinnamon, cloves and cardamom) until thickened. It is topped with nuts (walnuts, hazelnuts, or almonds).

== Beverages ==
=== Alcoholic ===
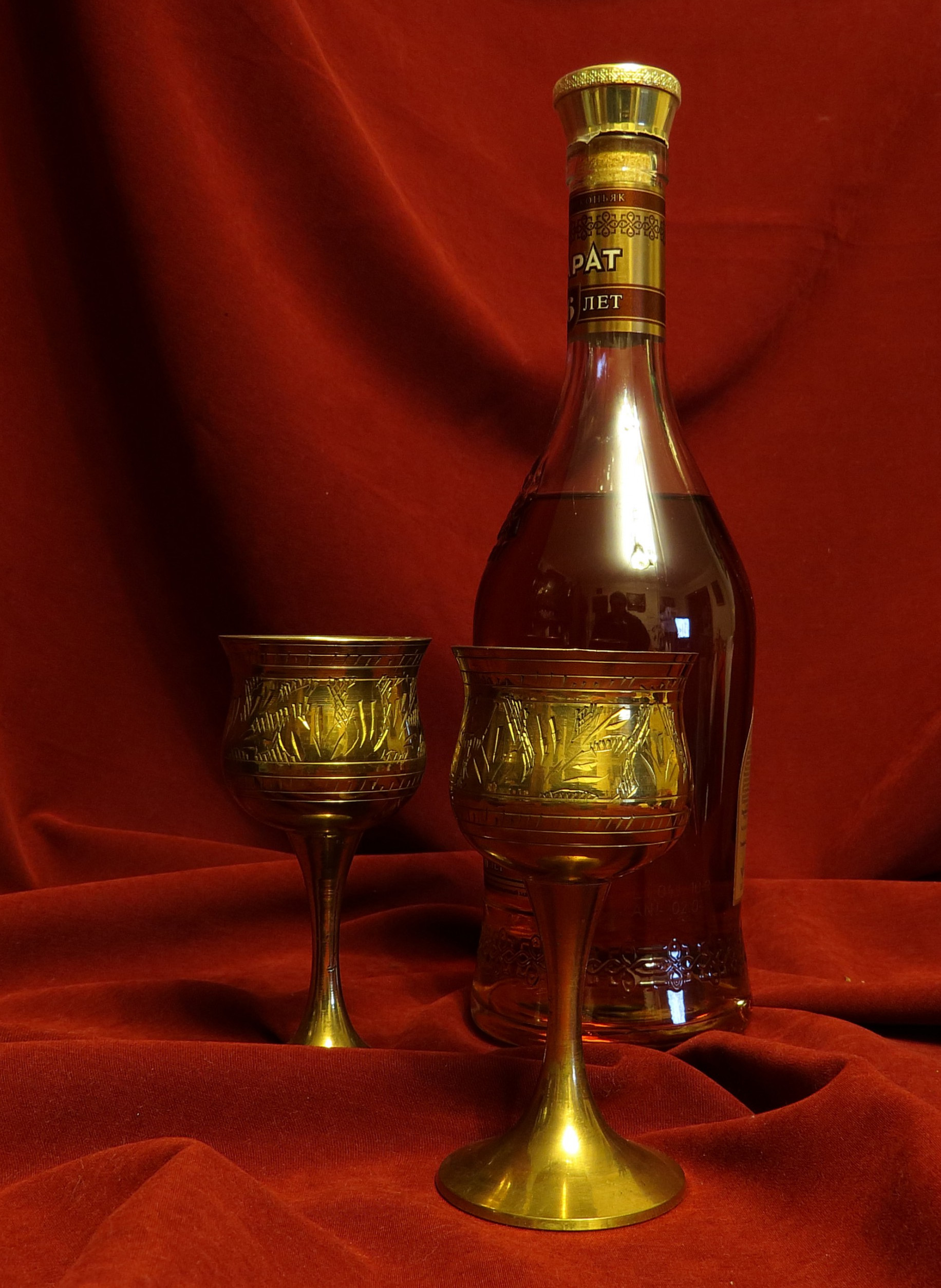
A bottle of Armenian Ararat brandy

- Ararat (Հայկական կոնյակ) — Famous Armenian brandy made from white grapes and spring water.
- Armenian wines (Հայկական գինիներ) — Most famous include : Voski, Karasi, Yeraz Areni, Khndoghni (Sireni), Haghtanak, Milagh, Aghavnadzor, Voskehat, Kangun, Garan Dmak, Mskhali, Nazeli, Chilar.
- Bagany (Бæгæны) — Ossetian beer made from wheat, barley and maize.
- Pomegranate wine (նռան գինի) — Armenian wine made from pomegranates.
- Makhsima (Мэхъсымэ) — Circassian alcohol made from corn flour and wheat. Similar to boza but has higher alcohol content.
- Arak (Арахъ) — Ossetian vodka made from cereals such as wheat or barley. However, some are made with fruits especially by the South Ossetians.
- Oghi (օղի) — Armenian distilled spirit made from fermented fruits. Mulberries are mostly used, but grapes, apricots, plums, cherries and peaches are also sometimes used to make it.
- Chacha (ჭაჭა) — Georgian vodka made from pomace (grape) or other fruits which is often homemade.
- Noy (Նոյ) — Armenian brandy produced by the Yerevan Brandy Company. It is made using Armenian grapes and spring water, aged in oak barrels.
- Georgian wines (ქართული ღვინოები) — Most famous include : Saperavi, Tsinandali, Akasheni, Kindzmarauli, Kvanchkara, Lykhny (made in Abkhazia), etc. Most of the wines are made in the region of Kakheti.
- Armenian beers (Հայկական գարեջուր) — Brewed from spring water, malted barley, hops, and yeast using traditional fermentation methods. Popular brands include Կիլիկիա (Kilikia), Դիլիջան (Dilijan), Լվիվ (Lviv), and Արարատ (Ararat).

=== Non-alcoholic ===
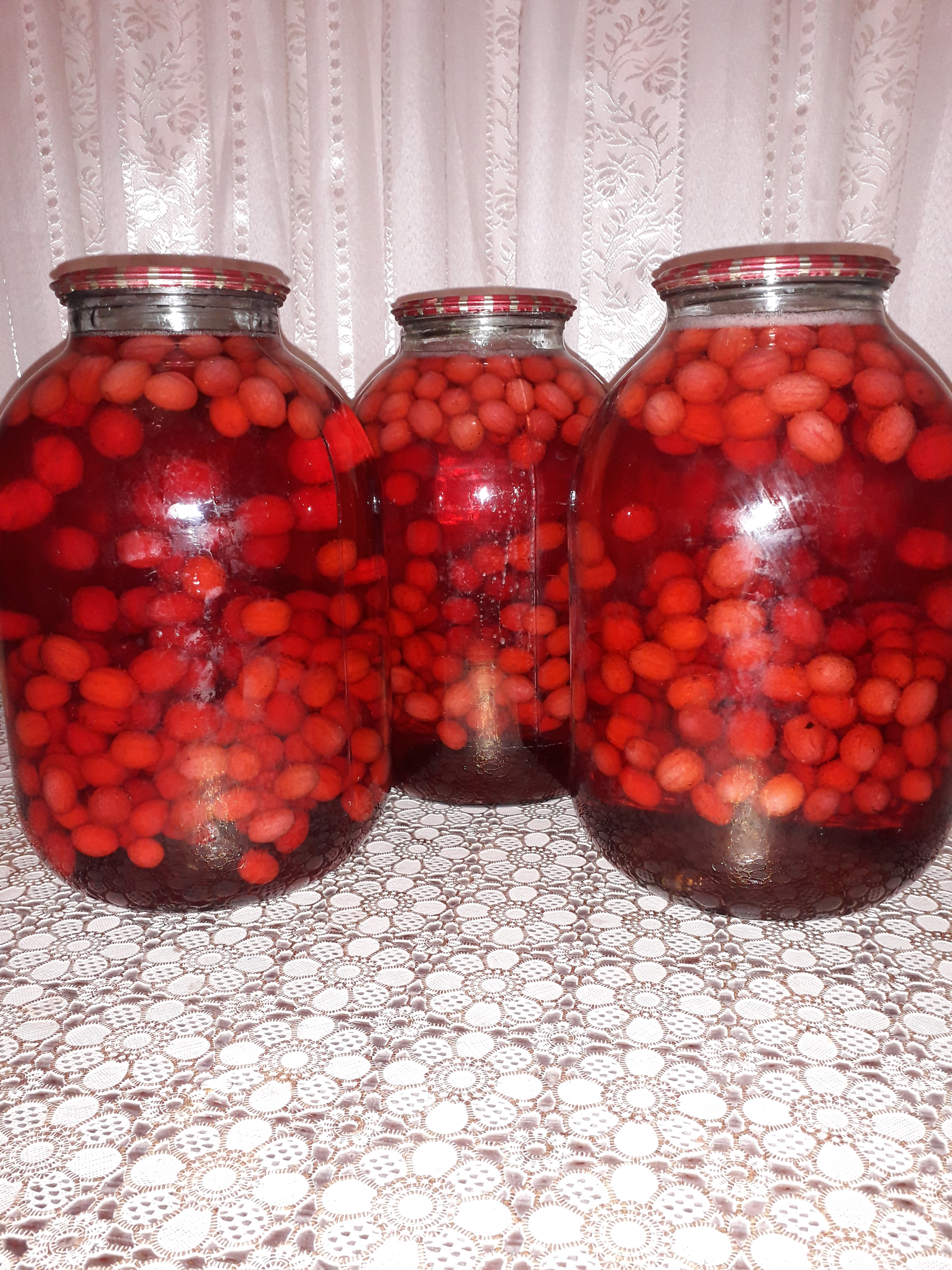
Armenian cornelian cherry kompot

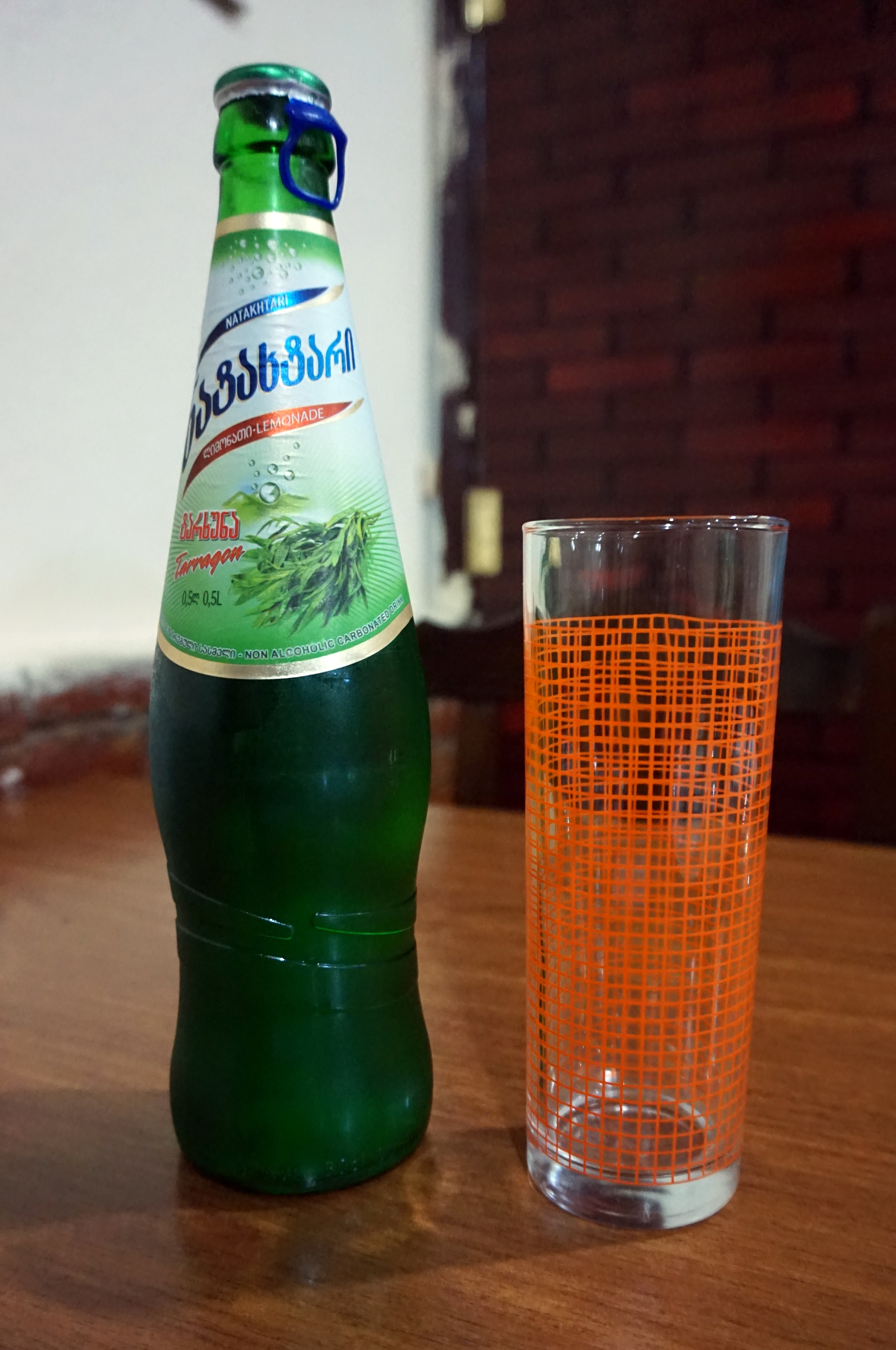
A bottle of Georgian tarkhuna

- Kompot (կոմպոտ / Компот) — Sweet beverage made from local fruits. The fruits its made from are in the same jar as the juice itself. The most popular fruits used to make Armenian kompot with are apricots, raspberries, cherries, peaches, plums, mulberries, and quinces.
- Tarkhuna (ტარხუნა / թարխուն) — Carbonated Georgian lemonade with tarragon flavour that is also popular in Armenia.
- Pear juice (տանձի հյութ / მსხლის წვენი) — Carbonated beverage made from pears popular in Armenia and Georgia. Armenian pear juice is said to taste slightly like bubble gum.
- Lagidzis water (ლაღიძის წყლები) — Georgian fruit, or chocolate-infused water, often sold in streets.
- Tan (Թան) — Armenian matzoon-based drink made by diluting matzoon with cold water and adding salt. Served chilled, often with mint or cucumber in summer.
- Ayran — Yogurt-based salty beverage, popular throughout the Turkic people of the North Caucasus and Azerbaijan.
- Armenian coffee (հայկական սուրճ) — Strong, finely ground coffee brewed slowly in a special pot called a srjeb (սրճեփ) over low heat. It is traditionally made with coffee grounds, water, cardamom and in some versions, sugar. It is served alongside desserts.
- Nogai Tea (Ногай Шай) — Salty tea brought in Northern Caucasus by the Nogais (Popular among the Dagestanis).
- Sharbat (շարբաթ / شربت / Şerbet) — Beverage made from herbs (such as mint), or fruits, popular in Armenia, Iran and Azerbaijan.
- Tach (ТӀач) — Lak kissel made from cereals.
- Tea (Çay / Թեյ / ჩაი / Чай / Цай) — Tea is an important beverage in the Caucasus. It is often served with murabba.
- Jermuk (Ջերմուկ) — Carbonated mineral water from Jermuk (Armenia).
- Borjomi (ბორჯომი) — Carbonated mineral water from the Borjomi Gorge.

== Gallery ==
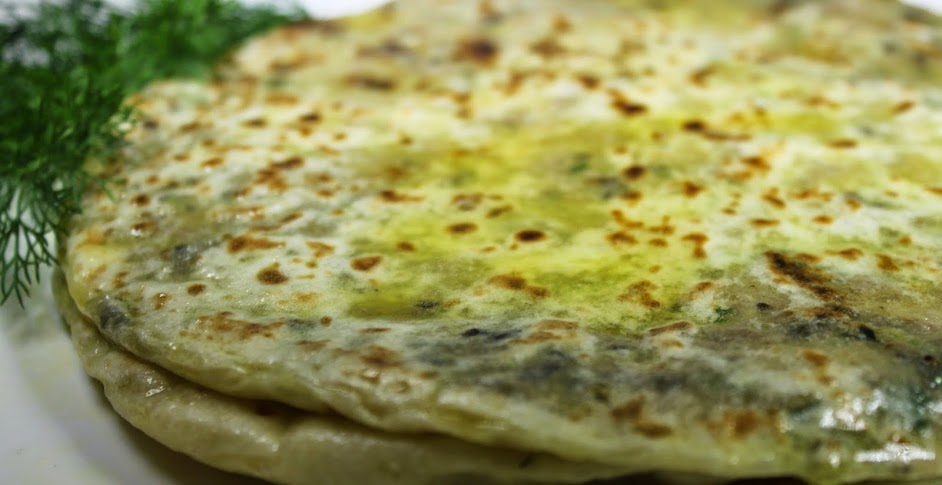
Khichin

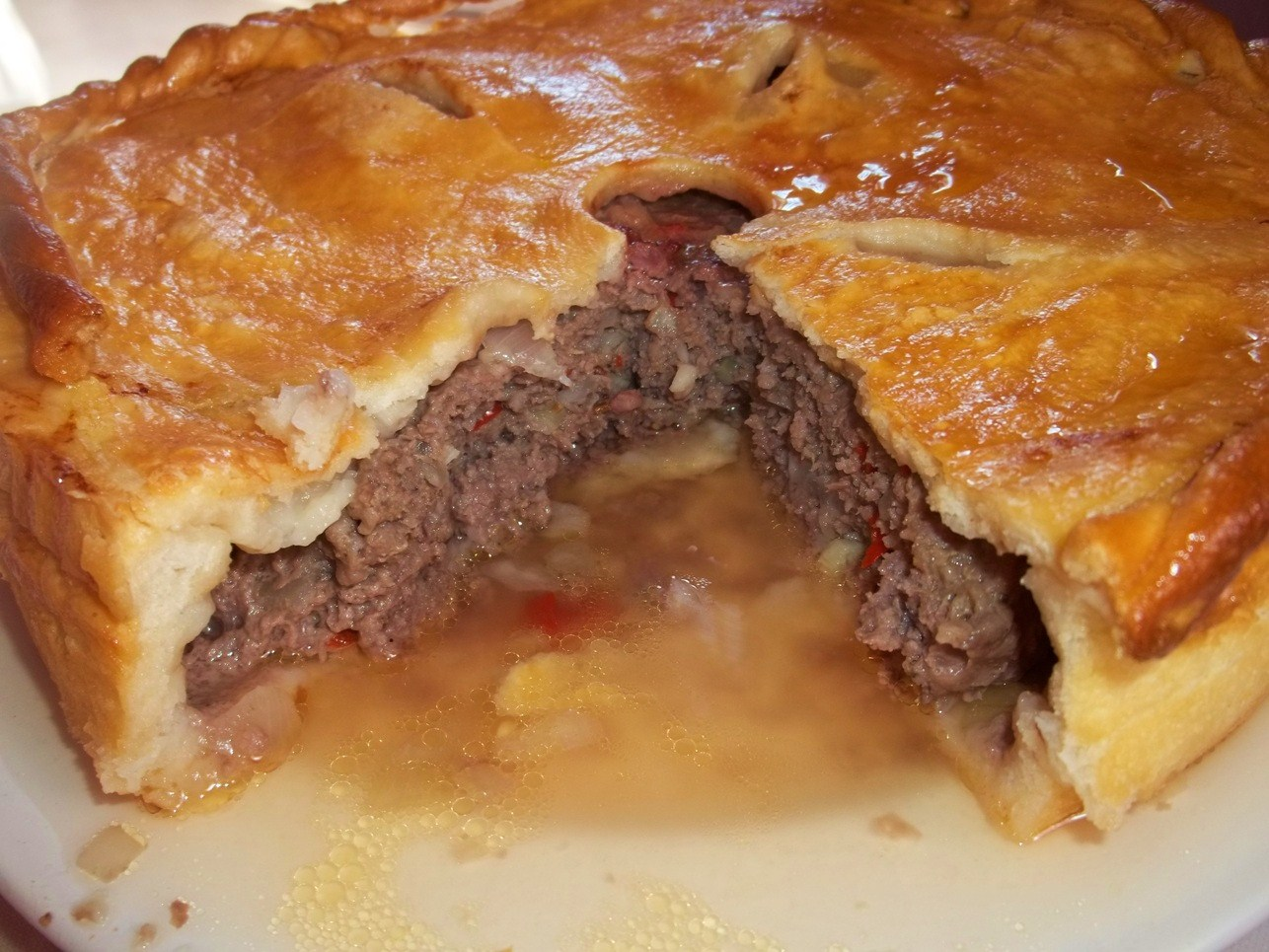
Ossetian pie, Fidzhin

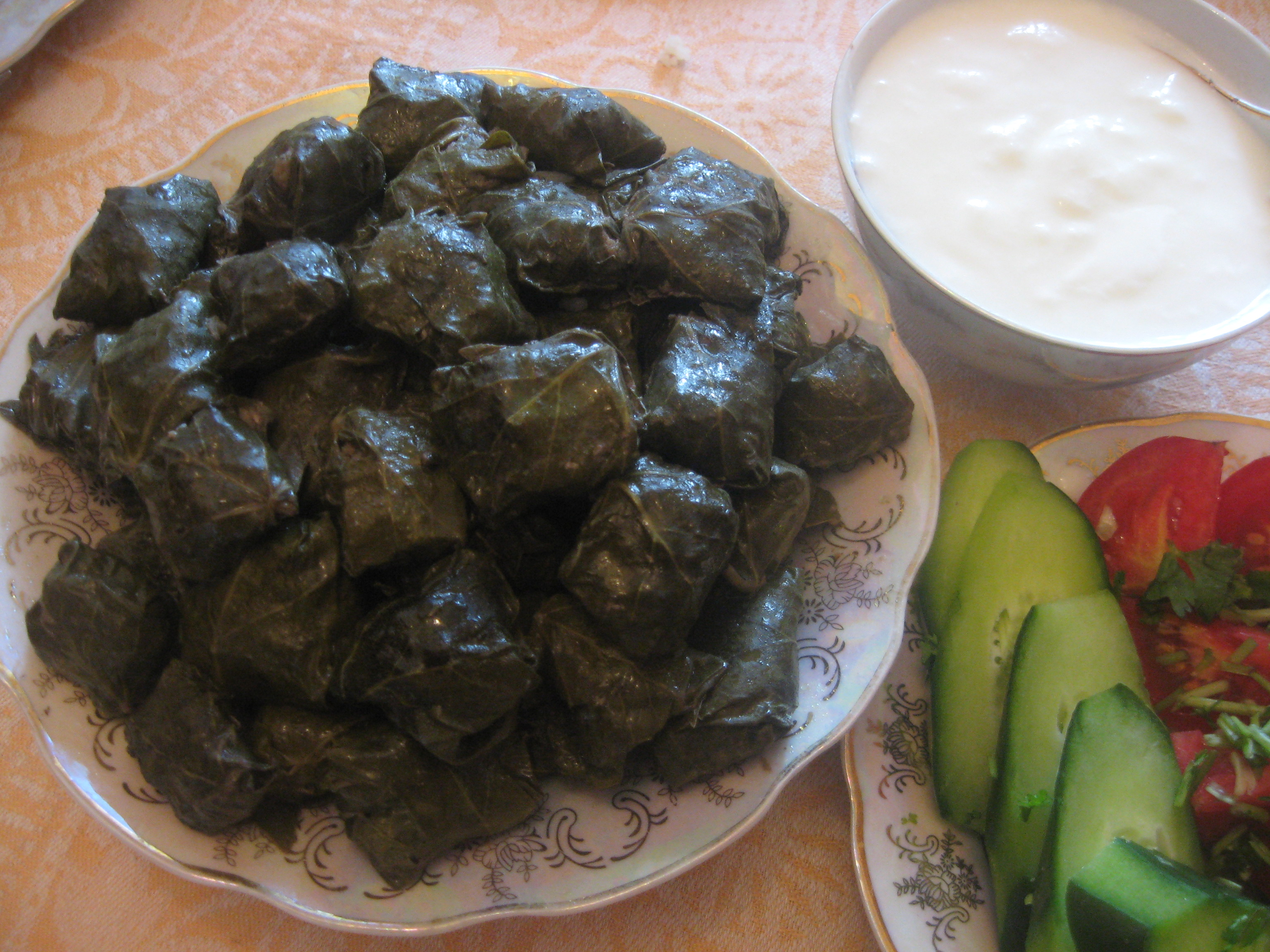
Dolma

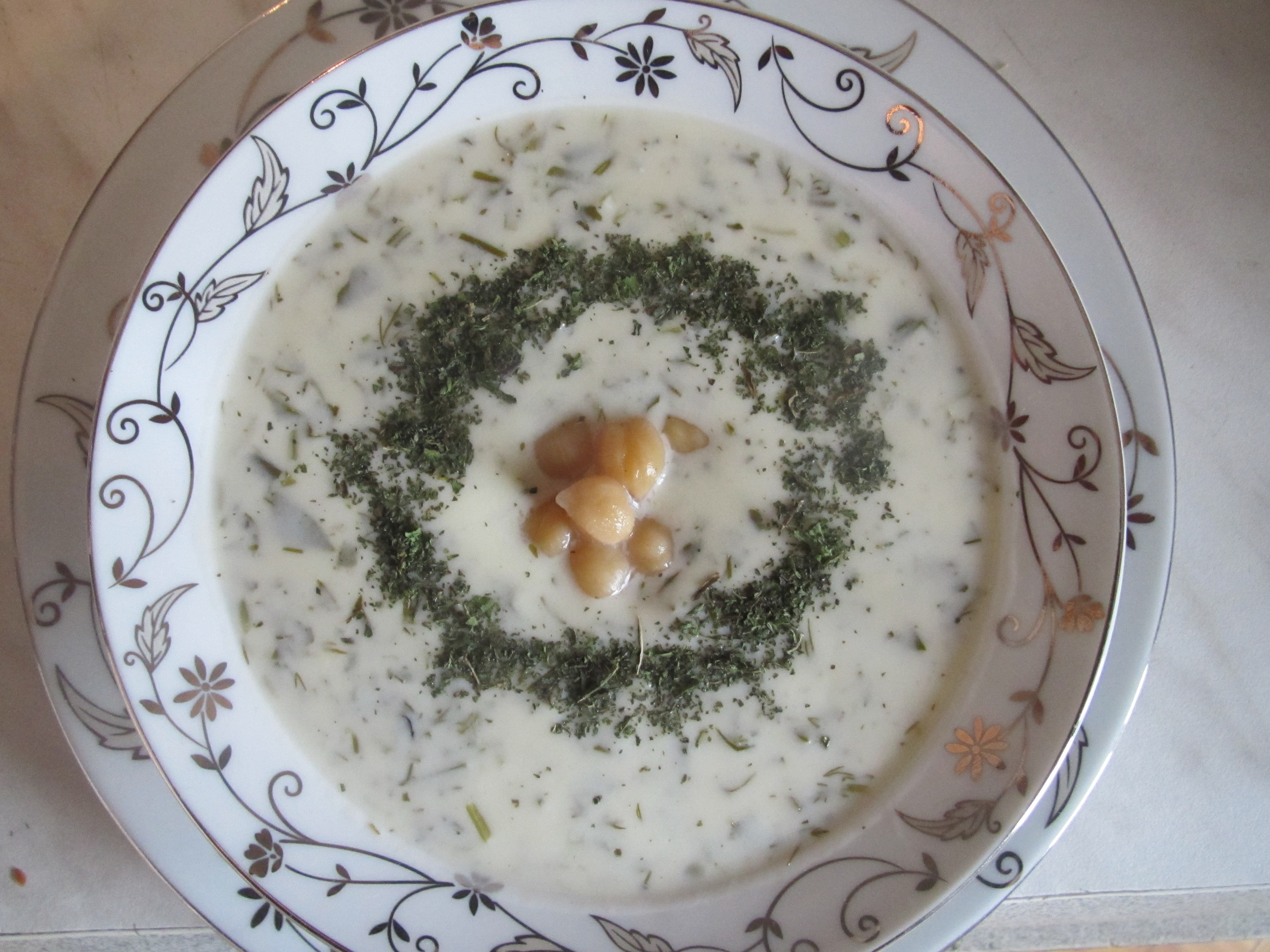
Dovğa

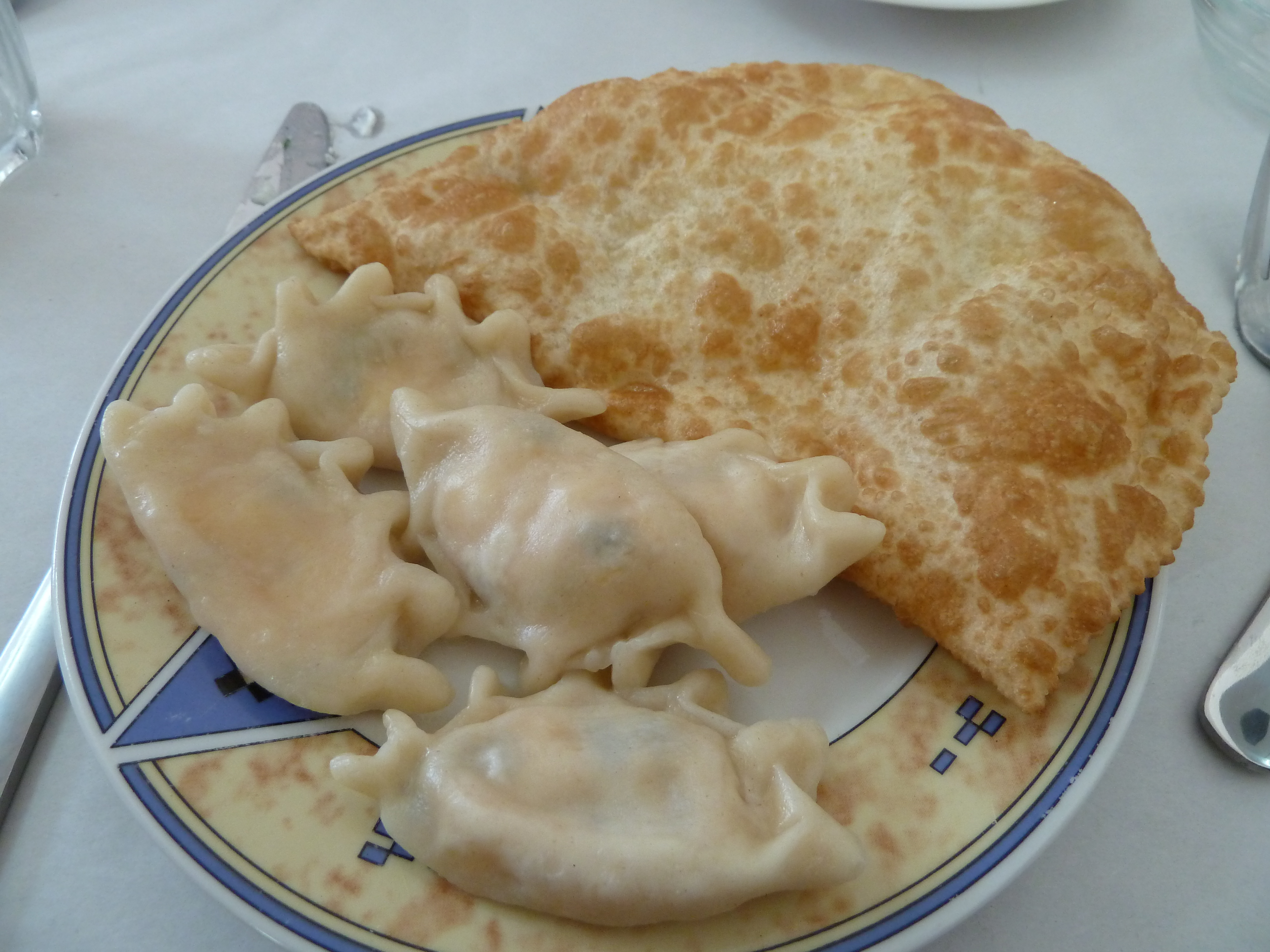
Mataz and Haliva

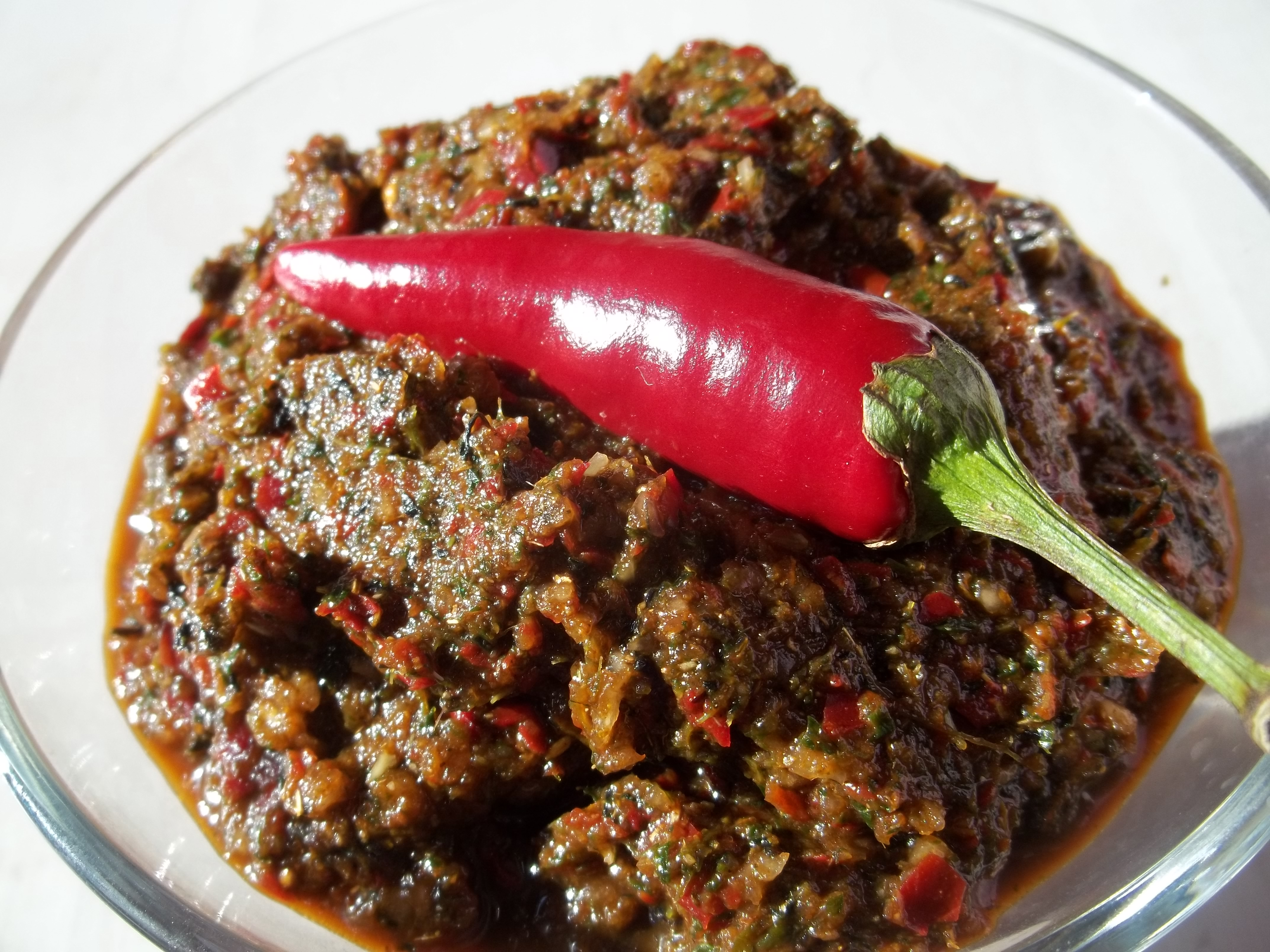
Adjika (red)

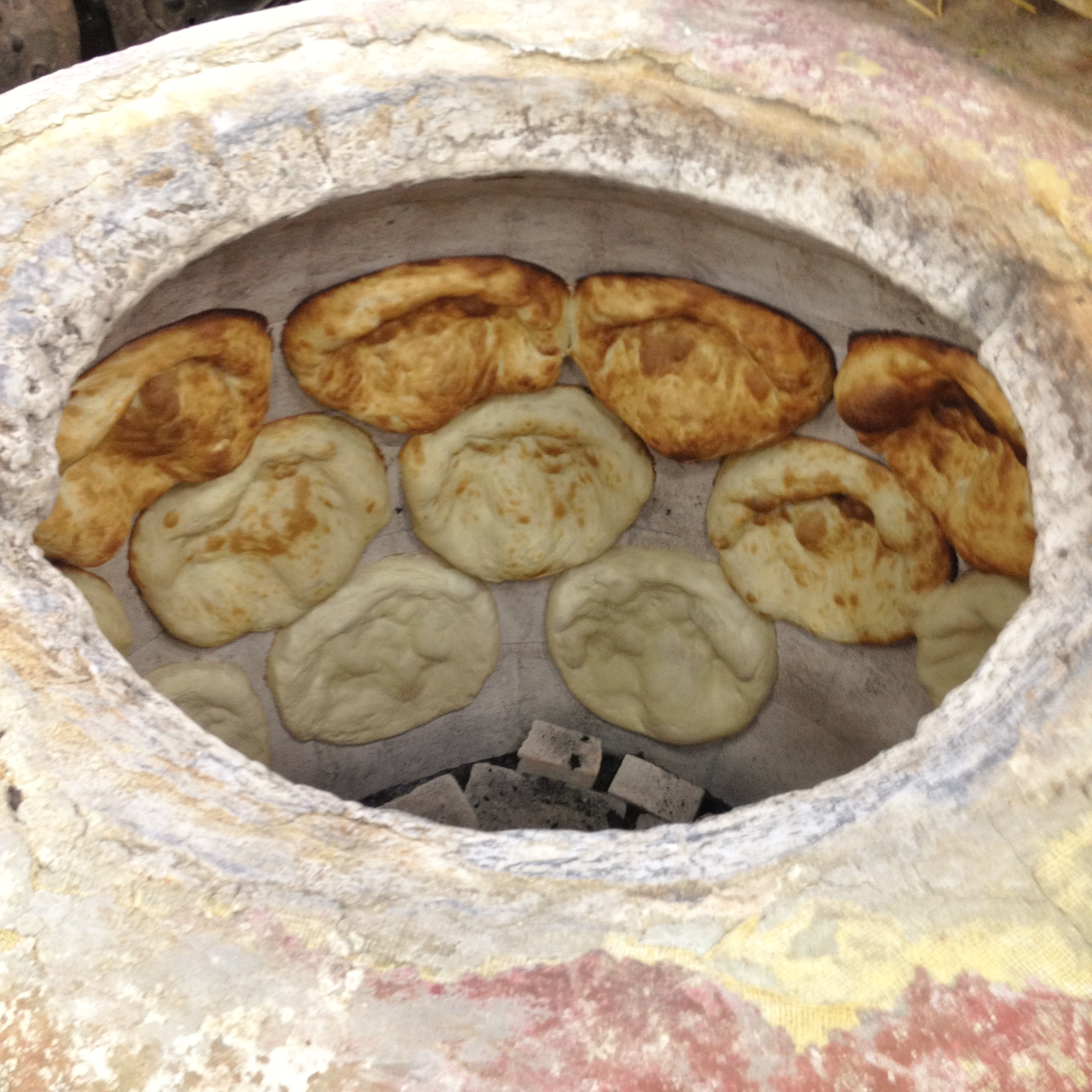
Tonis puri in Tone

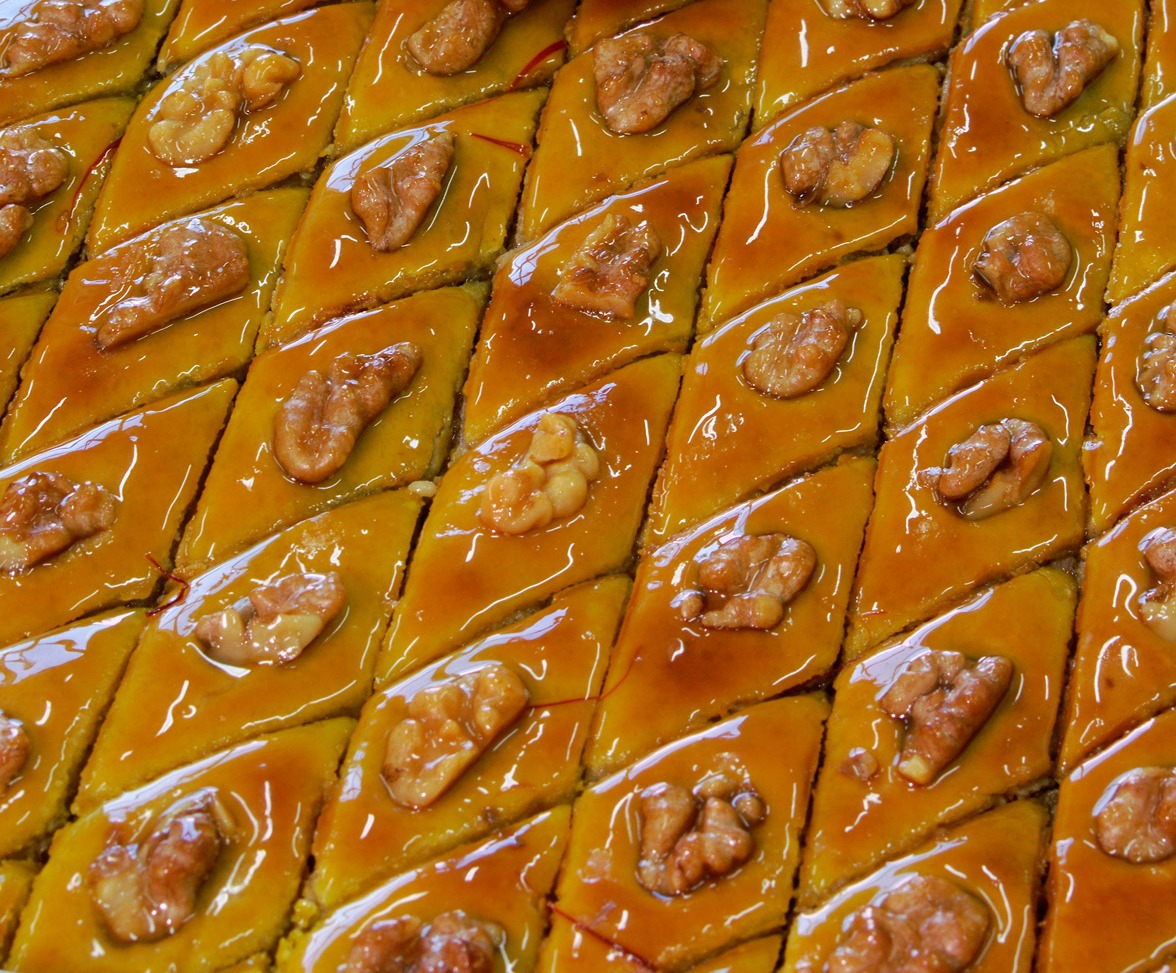
Pakhlava

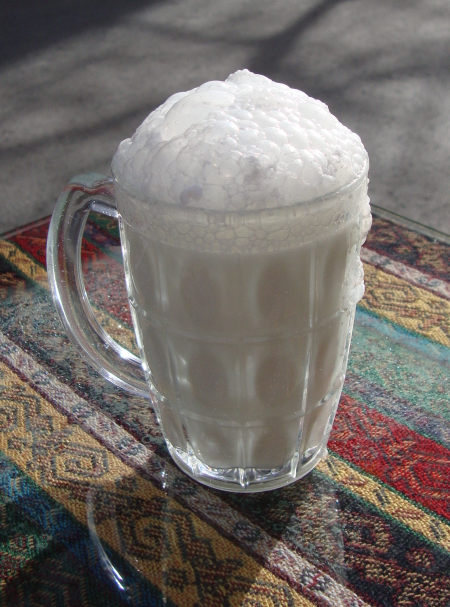
Ayran/Tan

== See also ==
- Armenian cuisine
- Azerbaijani cuisine
- Georgian cuisine
- Soviet cuisine
- History of the Caucasus
- Peoples of the Caucasus

== Sources ==
- Albala, Ken (2011). Food Cultures of the World Encyclopedia. Vol. 2. Santa Barbara, California: ABC-CLIO. ISBN 9780313376269.
