= Tashmijabi =

Georgian dish

- Type: potato, cheese
- Region or state: Svaneti, Georgia

Tashmijabi (Georgian: თაშმიჯაბი, romanized: tashmijabi, lit. 'boiled cheese' in Svan) is a traditional Georgian dish from Svaneti region, consisting of mashed potatoes mixed with sulguni cheese, milk, and butter. It is a hot, creamy, and elastic dish often served as a main or side.

== History ==
Potatoes are boiled in the skin for tashmijabi as the skin preserves the potato's beneficial properties when being boiled, and once they are cold, after peeling them they are put in a pot, mashed, mixed with milk or hot water, and put over a low flame. After adding cheese it should be stirred until the cheese melts and the whole thing becomes uniform and stretchy. It is on the list of the National Agency for Cultural Heritage Preservation of Georgia.

== See also ==
- Elarji
- Guda cheese
- List of potato dishes
