= Chashushuli =

Georgian dish with meat and tomatoes

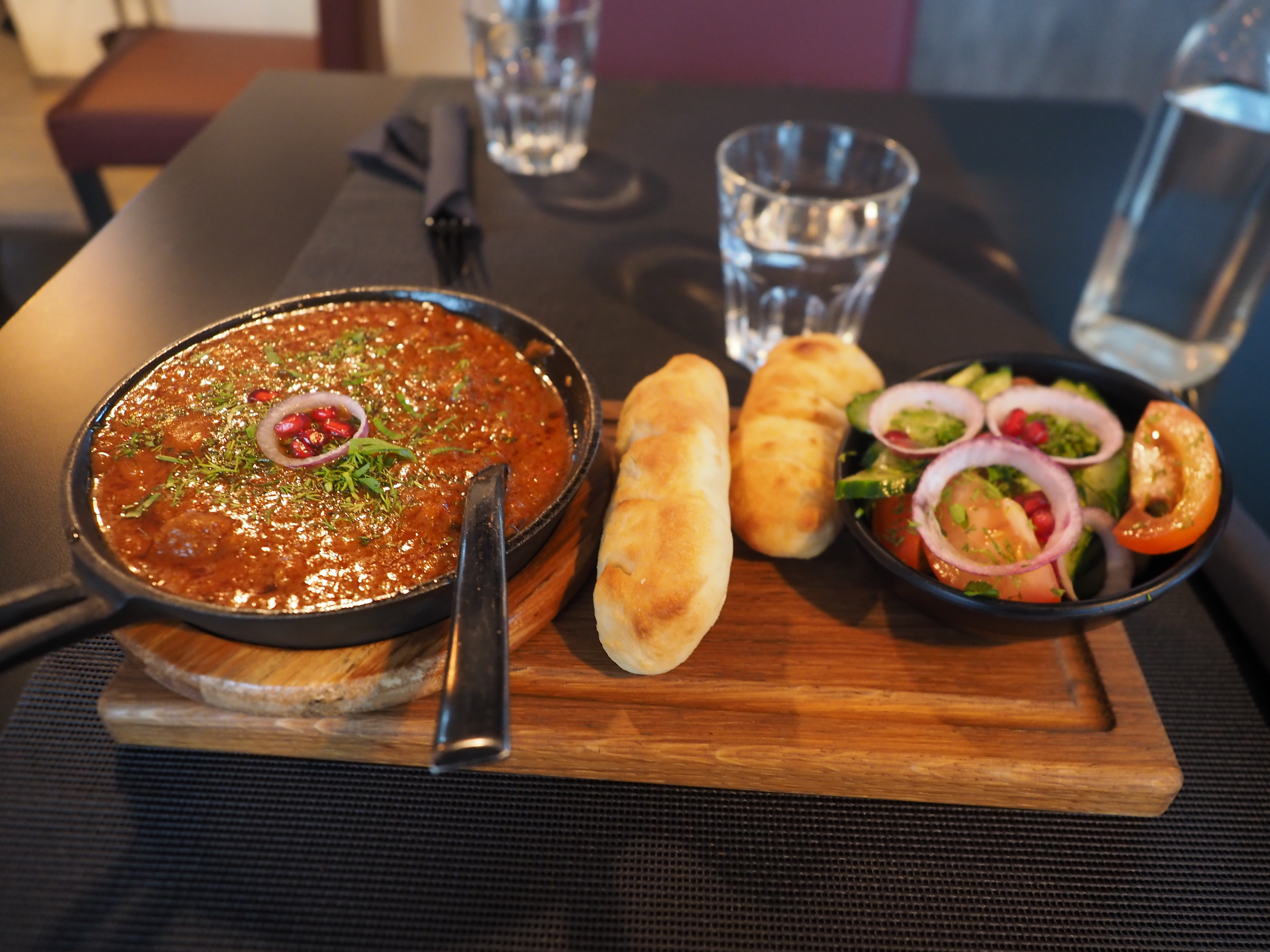
- Place of origin: Georgia

Chashushuli (Georgian: ჩაშუშული - "stew") is a dish of Georgian cuisine. The meat (veal in the original recipe) is fried and then stewed with tomatoes. One of the main meat dishes of Georgian cuisine, it is less known outside Georgia than, for example, Satsivi or Chakhokhbili.

== Ingredients ==
The main ingredients of the dish are meat (veal in the classic recipe, but beef is increasingly used; lamb much less often) and tomatoes (or tomato paste). Sweet pepper is also used in a number of recipes, often a combination of yellow and green peppers. Among the necessary components are onions and garlic. In addition to traditional salt and black pepper, ajika, suneli hops, parsley, dill, cilantro, ground coriander and ground hot red pepper can be used as seasonings.

== Cooking ==
The meat is cut into small pieces and fried over high heat in a deep frying pan or stew pan (or in a cauldron according to the classic recipe). After the liquid in the meat has evaporated, diced onions are added. When the onion becomes soft, hot boiled water is added to the container and the dish begins to stew over low heat; water is added as needed.

When the meat is almost ready, peeled tomatoes (fresh or in their own juice) and tomato paste, seasonings, and, shortly before serving, finely chopped herbs are added to it.

Served on ketsi, without garnish; with lavash and white wine.
