= Gebzhalia =

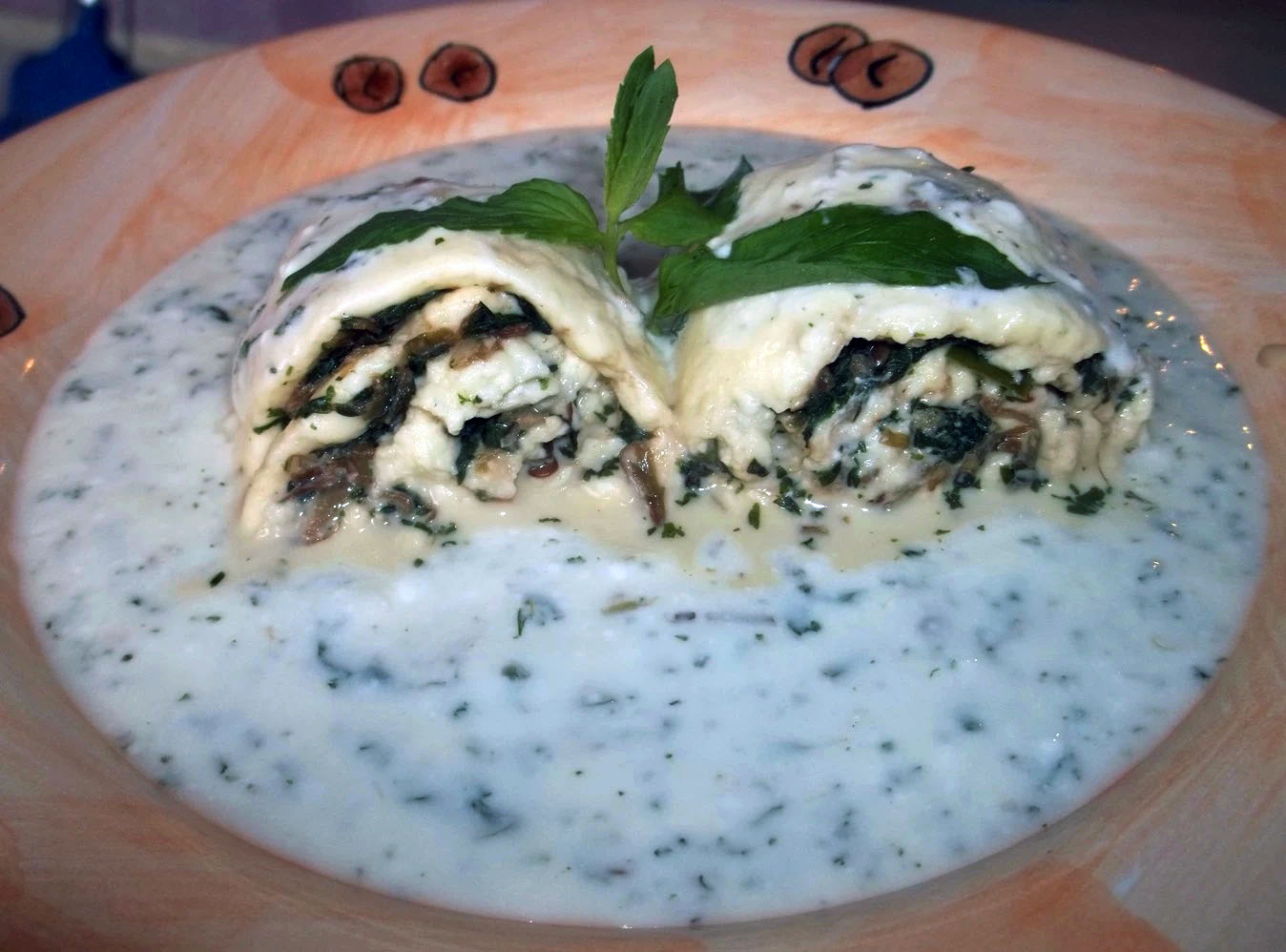
- Place of origin: Georgia
- Region or state: Samegrelo
- Serving temperature: cold

Gebzhalia (Georgian: გებჟალია, romanized: gebzhalia) is a traditional Georgian dish, and a staple in region of Samegrelo. It consists of cheese rolls with the addition of mint or filled with green ajika.

== History ==
Gebzhalia is prepared using young, unsalted Imeretian cheese, or Suluguni with mint. The dish is served with a mint-and-milk sauce made from Nadugi (a curd cheese similar to ricotta) combined with milk or matsoni. Some recipes call for Khacho curd cheese and Chkhinti cheese; the addition of tarragon, cilantro, garlic, green peppers, and even chili peppers. Salt may also be added. The mint is rinsed in cold water. The leaves, or the tender upper parts of the stems along with the leaves are very finely chopped with a knife (or blended). Three-quarters of the mint is added to the dish, while the remainder is reserved for the accompanying sauce.

To prepare the sauce, the remaining chopped mint is added to the matsoni, and the pieces of Gebzhalia are then covered with this sauce. The dish is served once it has had time to rest and meld with the sauce.

It's recommended to serve gebzhalia with Mchadi or Georgian cornmeal called ghomi.

== See also ==
- Sulguni
