= Georgian cuisine =

Culinary traditions of the country of Georgia

Georgian cuisine (Georgian: ქართული სამზარეულო, romanized: kartuli samzareulo) consists of cooking traditions, techniques, and practices of Georgia. Georgian cuisine has a distinct character, while bearing some similarities with various national cuisines of the Caucasus, the Middle East and Eastern Europe. Every region of Georgia has its own distinct style of food preparation. Eating and drinking are important parts of Georgian culture.

Georgia was one of the countries on the Silk Road, which resulted in travelers influencing Georgian cuisine. The Georgian love of family and friends is one of the reasons why the supra (feast) is so important in Georgia. Supra is offered spontaneously to relatives, friends or guests. Every supra has its tamada (toastmaster), who gives the toast and entertains the guests.

== Regional traditional cuisines ==
=== Abkhazia ===
Abkhazian cuisine uses many spices and walnuts. The most popular dishes from Abkhazia are abysta (абыста, porridge made of corn, similar to the Margal ghomi); apyrpylchapa (апырпылчапа, pepper skin stuffed with walnut sauce); achma (ачма, a variation of khachapuri); aritsvmgeli (арицвмгели, cornbread with walnuts); achash (ачаш, Abkhaz chudu, with cheese); achapa (ачапа, kidney beans with walnuts); and akutaghchapa (акутагьчапа, hard-boiled eggs filled with walnuts, similar to deviled eggs). The most popular dessert is akuarkuar, a cookie with honey. Ajika is a hot, spicy, but subtly flavored sauce or paste, often used to flavor food. Ajika is also sold as a dry spice blend. Abkhazian wines include Lykhny, Apsny, and Anakopia.

=== Adjara ===
Adjarian cuisine is considered a very diversified cuisine, which has been influenced by its geography (seaside, mountainous part) and by its history. In the mountainous Adjara, the main products are dairy products and the dishes are more fat and heavy and on the other side, in the seaside of the region, dishes are mostly spiced, and use many fresh herbs. The most popular dishes in Adjara are Adjaruli khachapuri (აჭარული ხაჭაპური); borano (ბორანო, chopped cheese fried in ghee); chirbuli (ჩირბული, an omelette with walnuts and tomato); malakhto (მალახტო, mashed kidney beans with walnuts and crude grape juice); iakhni (იახნი, a stew similar to kharcho, traditionally made in and around Kobuleti); khavitsi (ხავიწი, a corn porridge with ghee); sinori (სინორი, made of nadughi and unleavened dough); pakhlava (პახლავა, a version of baklava); and shaqarlama (შაქარლამა, a biscuit).

=== Guria ===
The cuisine of Guria is based mostly on poultry (especially chicken), cornbread (mchadi) and walnuts, like the cuisine of Imereti. The best-known dishes from Guria are satsivi (საცივი, meat, mostly of chicken or turkey in bazhe walnut sauce); mchadi (მჭადი, cornbread); kupati (კუპატი, sausage made from pork meat); badrijani Nigvzit (ბადრიჯანი ნიგვზით, fried eggplant with walnut sauce); Guruli gvezeli (გურული ღვეზელი, crescent-shaped pie filled with cheese and hard-boiled egg, usually eaten on Christmas Day); brinjula (ბრინჯულა, a cheese omelette with a dough base similar to khachapuri); and pkhali (ფხალი) and kuchmachi (კუჭმაჭი, beef or poultry livers with walnut sauce and pomegranate).

=== Imereti ===
The cuisine of Imereti shares many affinities with the neighbouring region of Guria and is known for its generous use of walnuts. The best-known Imeretian dishes include Imeruli khachapuri (იმერული ხაჭაპური, the most common version of the Georgian cheese bread), mchadi (მჭადი, cornbread), pkhali (ფხალი), kuchmachi (კუჭმაჭი, beef or poultry livers with walnut sauce and pomegranate), soko (სოკო, fried mushrooms), lobio (ლობიო, mashed red beans with spices), badrijani Nigvzit (ბადრიჯანი ნიგვზით, fried eggplant with walnut sauce), chakhokhbili (ჩახოხბილი, tomato-based soup with poultry meat), mtsnili (მწნილი, pickled vegetables such as cucumbers, cabbage, beets, and jonjoli), ekala (ეკალა, pkhali made from smilax) kupati (კუპატი, pork sausage), satsivi (საცივი, meat, mostly of chicken or turkey in bazhe walnut sauce), and tsitsila isrim-maqvalshi (წიწილა ისრიმ-მაყვალში, roasted chick in a blackberry- and grape-based sauce). Imereti is known for its cheeses such as chkinti (ჭყინტი, salty cheese), Imeruli kveli (იმერული ყველი), and sulguni (სულგუნი).

=== Kakheti ===
Kakhetian cuisine is considered to be a more meat-based cuisine and the region itself is called the "Region of Wine". It is also known as the birthplace of one type of Georgian bread: Shoti.

- Notable dishes from Kakheti include Mtsvadi (მწვადი - meat cooked on fire), Chakapuli (ჩაქაფული - soup made of fresh herbs such as tarragon and meat of sheep or lamb), Khinkali (ხინკალი - dumplings filled with meat and seasoned with herbs), Khashlama (ხაშლამა - boiled meat of beef or lamb), Khashi (ხაში - boiled meat, often eaten after Supra), Chanakhi (ჩანახი - soup made of lamb and tomatoes), Chikhirtma (ჩიხირთმა - soup made of chicken meat), and Ajapsandali (აჯაფსანდალი - kind of ragout made of eggplants, potatoes and tomatoes).
- In Kakheti, they make famous desserts such as Churchkhela (ჩურჩხელა - Candy made of grape juice and walnuts), and Pelamushi (ფელამუში - Dessert made of grape juice).
- Kakheti is also well known for its wines, with wine-growing regions such as the Alazani valley, Tsinandali and Kindzmarauli and many indigenous grape varieties including Saperavi, Kisi, Rkatsiteli and Mtsvane.

=== Kartli ===
Kartli is known as a very rich region in terms of fruits (especially apples, apricots, figs, and peaches) and vegetables (especially cucumbers, tomatoes, and onions).

- Kartlian dishes include Puris Kharcho (პურის ხარჩო - a kind of soup made of bread), Shechamandi (შეჭამანდი - soup made of dogwood or docks), Jonjoli (ჯონჯოლი - pickles made of Bladdernuts), Chakhrakina (ჭახრაკინა - a kind of Khachapuri filled with cheese and beetroot leaves), Khabizgina (ხაბიზგინა - Ossetian Khachapuri filled with cheese and potatoes), Capers in Kaspi known as (capari) (კაპარი) and Chakapuli (ჩაქაფული - soup made of fresh herbs and meat of lamb or beef).

=== Lazeti ===
Though most of the historical part of Lazeti is located in Turkey, Lazes in Georgia, especially in Sarpi, still continue to carry their traditional dishes, some of them being :

- Paponi (ბურეღი/ფაფონი): Baked sweet pastry filled with milk pudding.
- Gresta (გრესტა): Chicken or beef with melted cheese and mushrooms.
- Kapça Tağaney (ქაფშია ტაღანეჲ): Fried anchovies and vegetables.
- Kapça Princoni (ქაფშა ფრინჯონი) : Anchovy pilaf.
- Kapçoni Mç̌kudi (ქაფშონი მჭკუდი): Fried cornbread with sliced anchovies, pkhali and herbs.
- Lu Dudey (ლუ დუდეჲ): Navy beans mixed with red Pkhali, onions and leeks.
- Lu Ncaxeyi (ლუ ნჯახეჲ): Sort of porridge made from different vegetables mostly cabbage, kidney beans, potato which are mixed with cornmeal.
- Muhlama (მუჰლამა): Cornmeal with cheese.

=== Samegrelo ===
The regional cuisine of Samegrelo can be considered the most famous in Georgia. It uses many spices and walnuts.

- Famous Megrelian dishes include Ghomi (ღომი - porridge made of corn meal), Elarji (ელარჯი - ghomi with Sulguni), Gebzhalia (გებჟალია - rolls of cheese seasoned with mint), Megrelian Khachapuri (მეგრული ხაჭაპური - Khachapuri with cheese added on the top), Kupati (კუპატი - sausage made from pork organs and belly meat), Tabaka (ტაბაკა - chicken cooked with Ajika), and Kharcho (ხარჩო - soup with beef).
- Sulguni (სულგუნი) is traditionally made in the region.
- Ajika (აჯიკა) is a sauce made of pepper and spices. It is made traditionally in Samegrelo and in Abkhazia.

=== Mtianeti, Khevi, Khevsureti, Pshavi and Tusheti ===
These cuisines are often considered as one due to their similarities.

- Famous dishes include Khinkali (ხინკალი - dumplings filled with meat, mushrooms, potatoes or cottage cheese), Gordila (გორდილა - boiled dough), Qaghi (ყაღი - dried and salted meat), Kaurma (ყაურმა - a kind of soup made from meat), Kotori (კოტორი - Khachapuri filled with cottage cheese), Khachoerbo (ხაჭოერბო - dried cottage cheese in a ball shape), Megrelian kharcho (ხარშო - beef stew in rich walnut sauce) and Khavitsi (ხავიწი - melted cheese)
- Tusheti also produces a goat / sheep based cheese, called Guda (გუდა).
- These regions are also well known for their beer (ლუდი), and spirit, Zhipitauri (ჟიპიტაური).

=== Racha-Lechkhumi ===
The cuisines of Racha and of Lechkhumi share most of their dishes and are often grouped into one cuisine as a consequence.

- Notable dishes include Shkmeruli (შქმერული - chicken in a sauce made of cream and garlic), Rachuli ham (ლორი - pork bacon), Lobiani (ლობიანი - a kind of Khachapuri filled with kidney beans and lori), Lobio (ლობიო - mashed kidney beans with spices), Rachuli Khachapuri (რაჭული ხაჭაპური - a kind of Khachapuri made into a square form).

=== Samtskhe-Javakheti ===
The Cuisine of Samtskhe-Javakheti consists of two regional cuisines: Meskhetian and Javakhetian. Due to their similarities, they are often considered one regional cuisine. This cuisine differs significantly from other regional cuisine of Georgia, partly because of its heavy use of goose meat and historical Turkish rule of the region.

- Famous dishes from Samtskhe-Javakheti include Batis Shechamandi (ბატის შეჭამანდი - soup made of goose), Meskhuri Khinkali (მესხური ხინკალი - Khinkali filled with goose), Apokhti (აპოხტი - dried meat of lamb, beef, goose and duck), Tatarboragi (თათარბორაგი - boiled dough), and Rdzis Korkoti (რძის კორკოტი - wheat grains boiled in milk).
- Snails or Lokokina (ლოკოკინა) are also a very common dish in the region due to the presence of French Catholics in the past.
- Samtskhe-Javakheti is also famous for its Chiri (ჩირი - dried fruits), Tklapi (ტყლაპი - fruit roll-up) and Tenili (ტენილი - a preserved, hand-pulled cheese).

=== Svaneti ===
- Main dishes from Svaneti include Kubdari (კუბდარი - also known as Svan Khachapuri, a kind of Khachapuri filled with seasoned beef or pork), P'etvraal (ფეტვრაალი - Khachapuri filled with cheese and millet), Chvishtari (ჭვიშტარი - Mchadi with Sulguni inside), Lutspeq (ლუცფექ - boiled barley grains seasoned with pepper and garlic), Kharshil (ხარშილ - soup of barley and urtica), Tashmijabi (თაშმიჯაბი - mashed potatoes with Sulguni).
- Svaneti is also famous for its local alcohol made from fruits such as elderberry, and even honey.
- Svan salt, a spiced salt
- Agasyllis (Svanetian ღეჰი Ghehi / (Georgian: დუცი Dootsi ) is a local, Angelica-like plant with medicinal properties that is also eaten raw, cooked and pickled as a delicacy considered to benefit the digestion. It is also taken to combat parasitic worms and to treat respiratory complaints.

== Appetizers ==
- Abkhazura (აფხაზურა): Caul-fat-rolled meatballs from Abkhazia.
- Achma (აჩმა): A dish with multiple layers of cheese and bread. It resembles a sauceless lasagna.
- Ajapsandali (აჯაფსანდალი): A traditional Georgian meal consisting of eggplant, potatoes, onions and spices.
- Badrijnis khizilala (ბადრიჯნის ხიზილალა): Fried and chopped eggplant. The name means "eggplant caviar".
- Jonjoli (ჯონჯოლი): Pickled flowers of bladdernut.
- Khachapuri (ხაჭაპური): Cheese-bread with regional variation. This dish is very popular outside Georgia, especially in the ex-USSR.
- Kuchmachi (კუჭმაჭი): Dish made of chicken livers.
- Kupati (კუპატი): Fried sausage from Western Georgia.
- Kubdari (კუბდარი): Meat-bread made from bread, meat (lamb, kid or pork), spices, and onions.
- Leek (პრასი ნიგვზით): Semi-boiled leek with walnut paste and vinegar.
- Lobiani (ლობიანი): Bean-stuffed khachapuri.
- Lobio (ლობიო): Mashed beans with spices.
- Matsoni (მაწონი): Dairy product of Armenian origin, similar to yogurt or sour cream.
- Muzhuzhi (მუჟუჟი): Pork jelly.
- Nadughi (ნადუღი): Cream-like dairy product.
- Nigvziani badrijani (ნიგზვიანი ბადრიჯანი): Fried eggplant with walnut paste.
- Pkhali (ფხალი): Minced and chopped vegetables, mostly made of spinach, beets, and cabbage.
- Satsivi (საცივი): Poultry in a special walnut sauce.
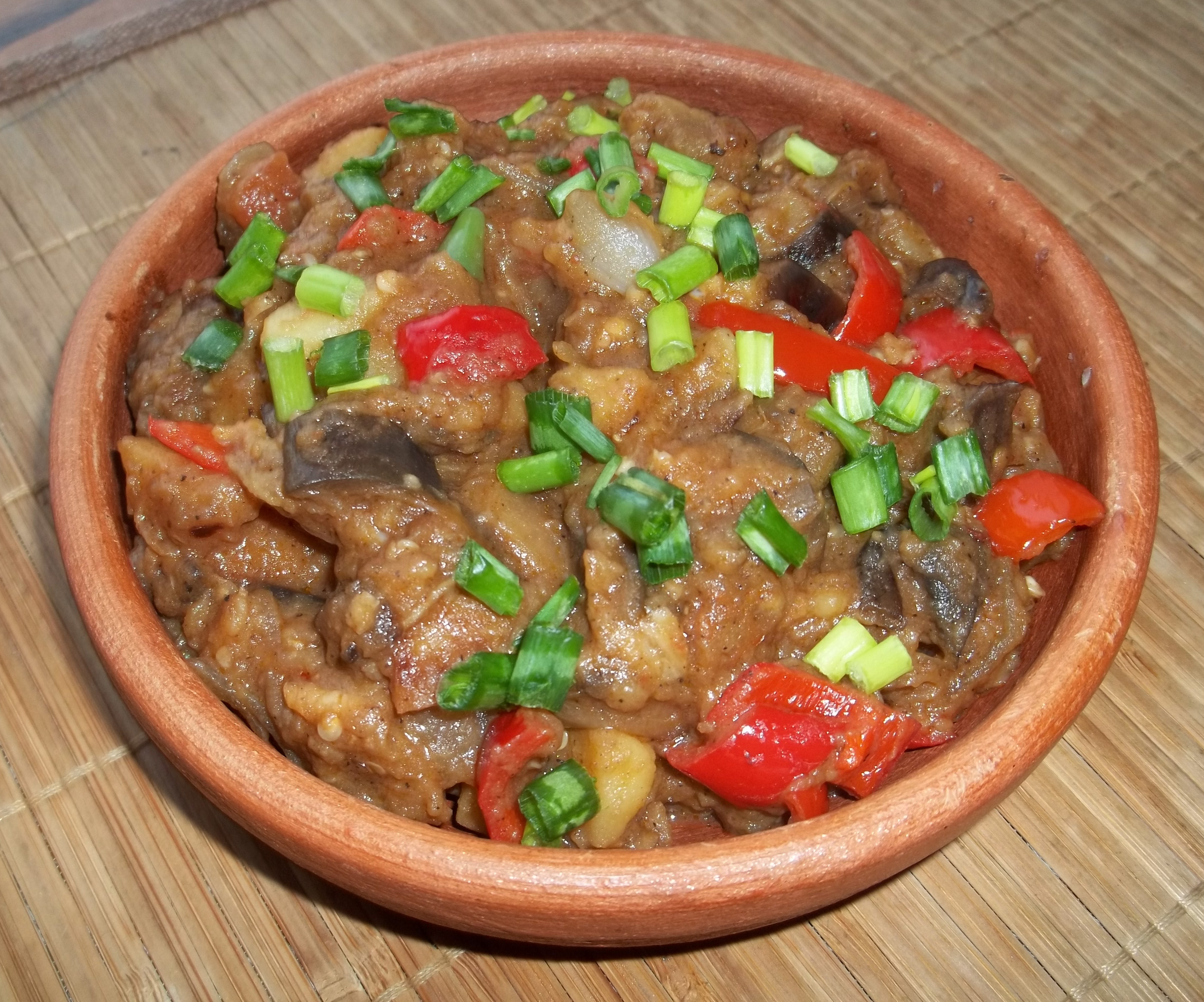
Ajapsandali

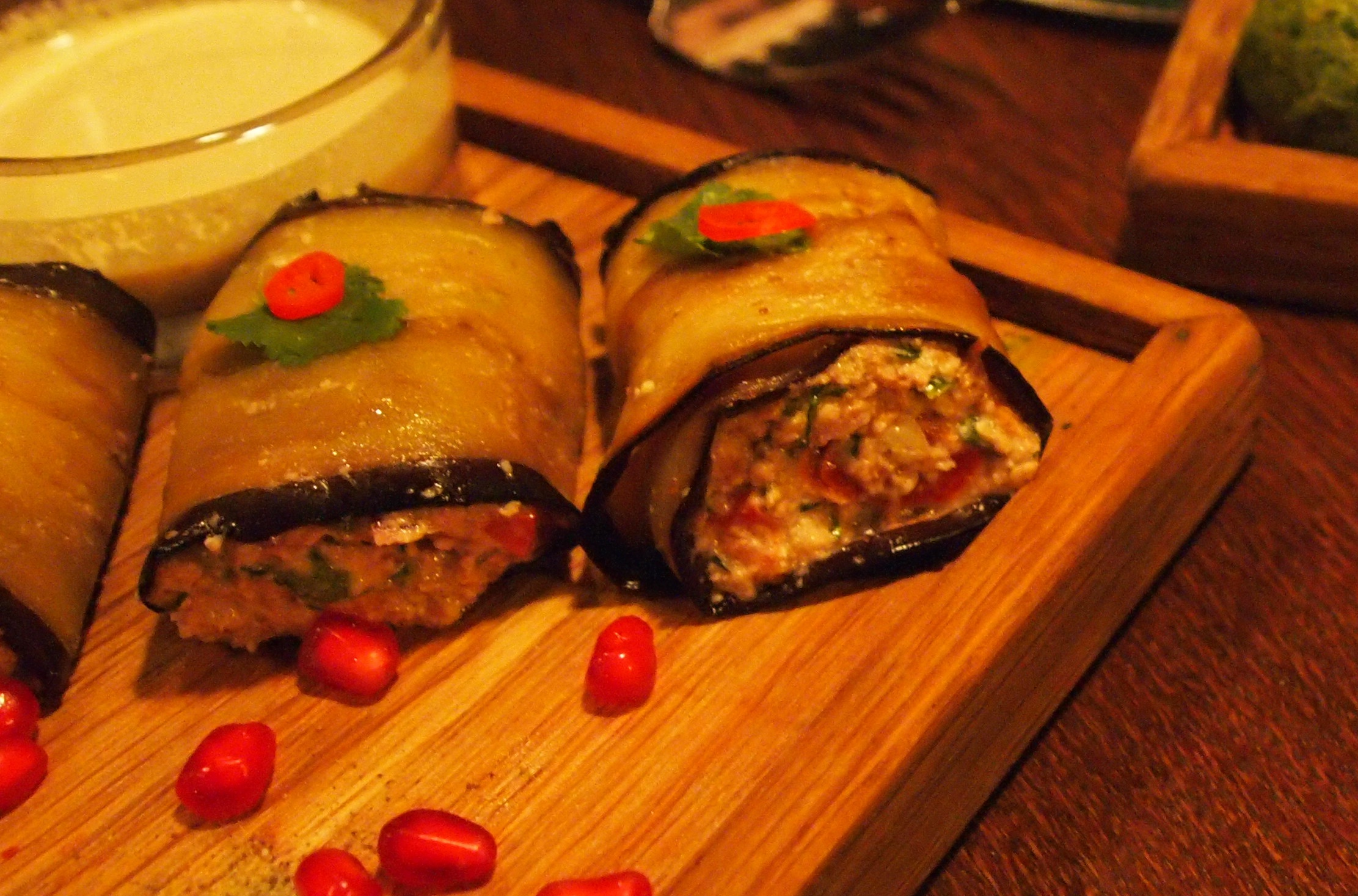
Nigvziani badrijani

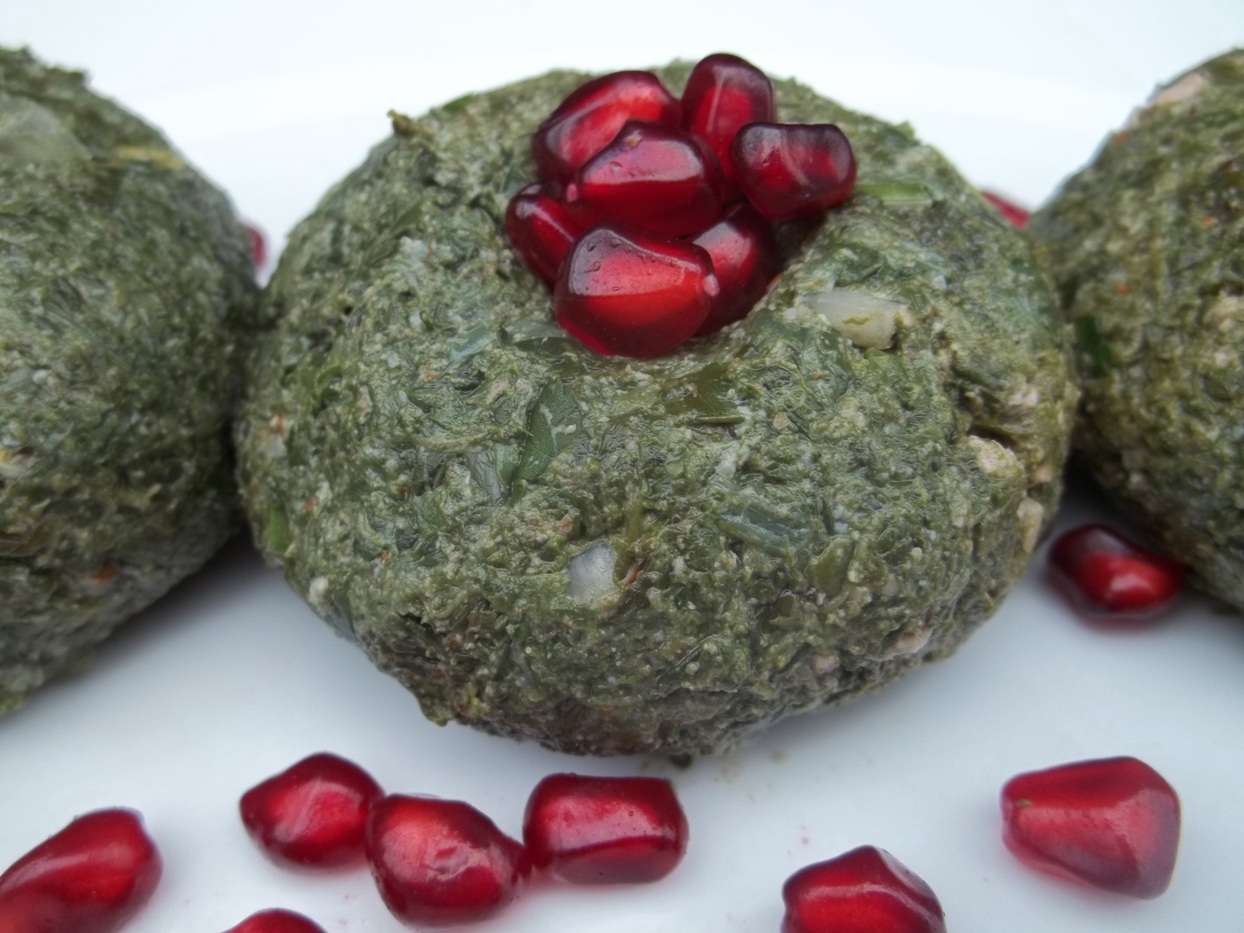
Spinach pkhali

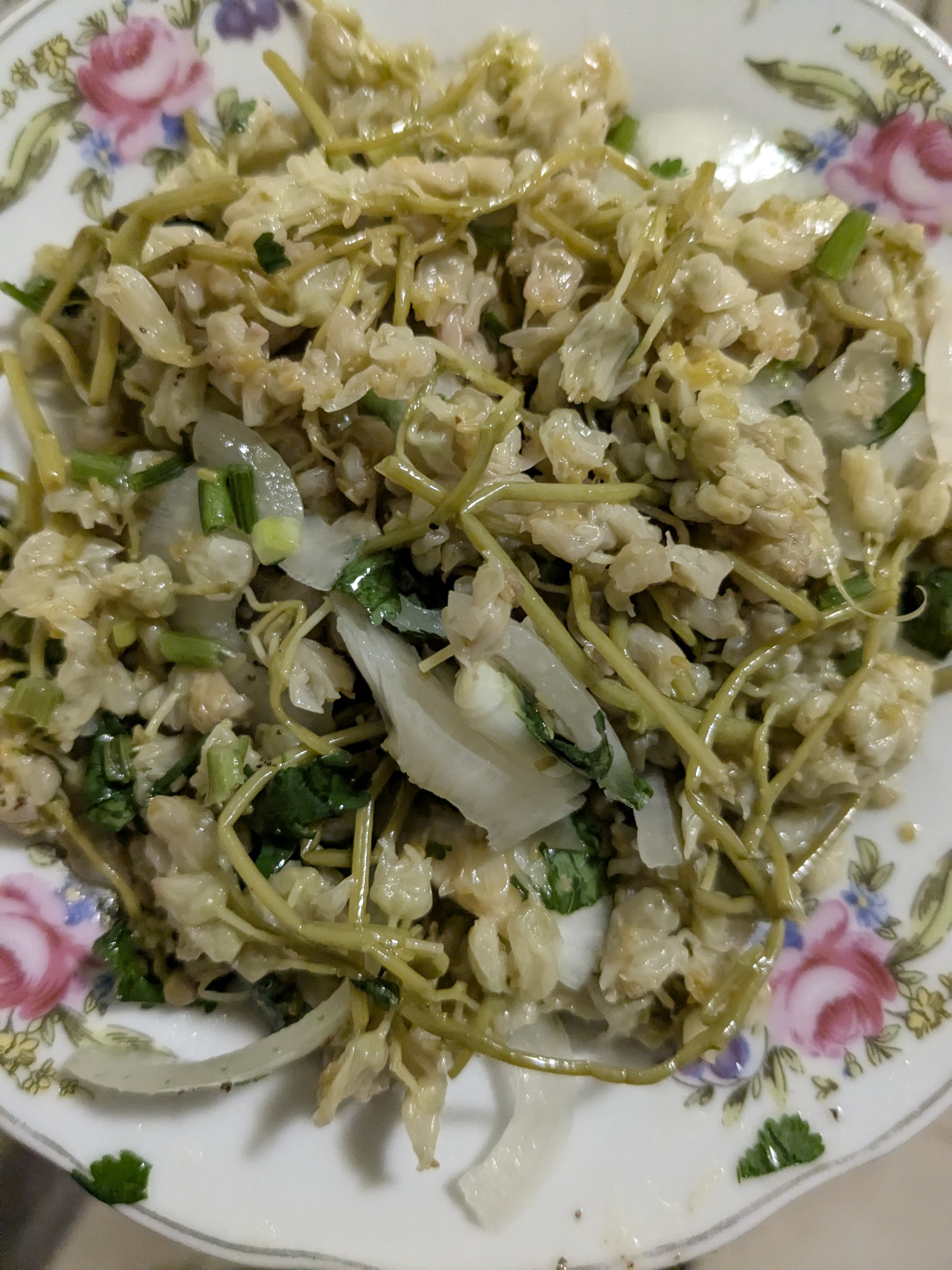
Jonjoli flower pickles

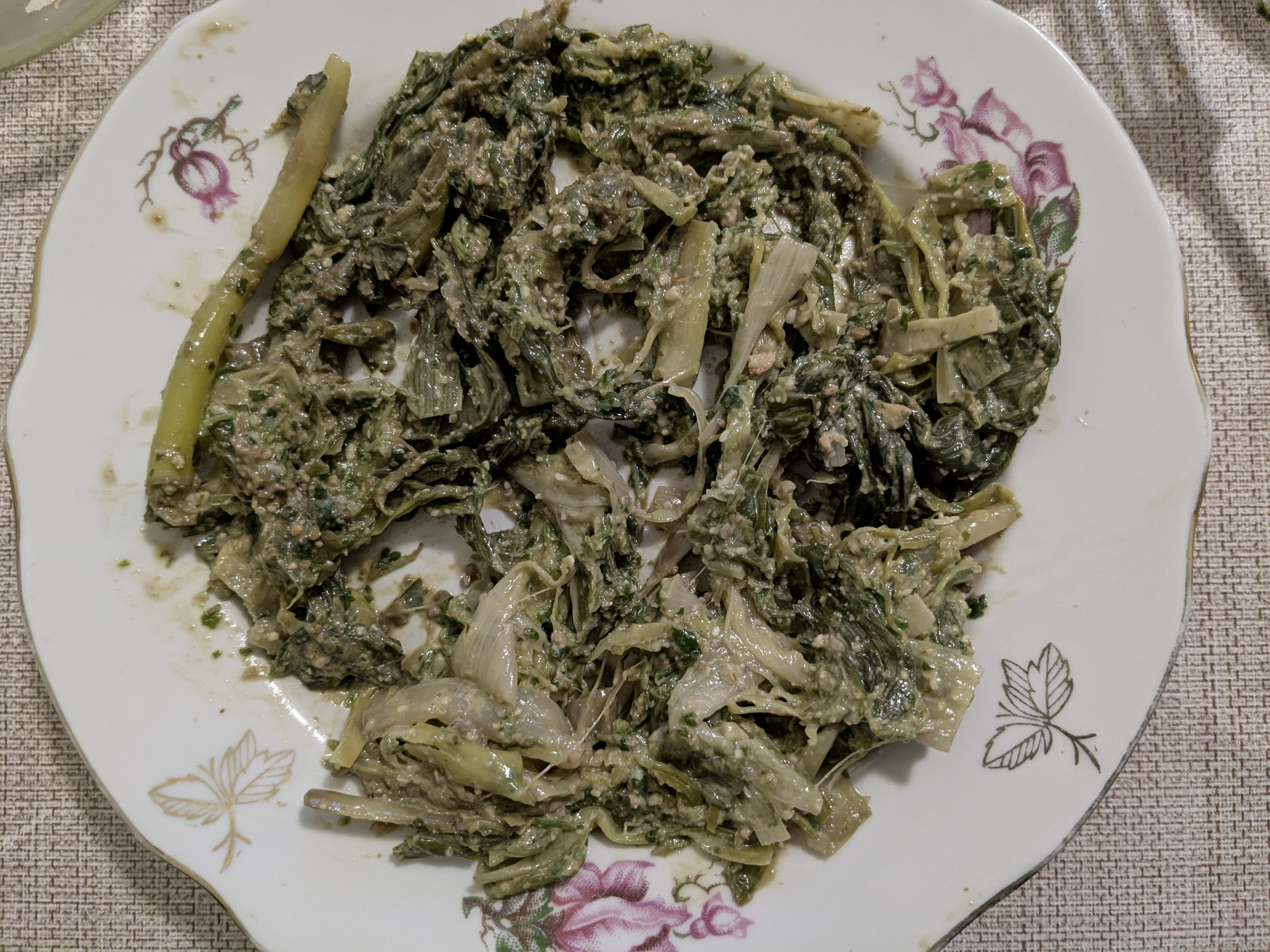
Leek with walnut paste

== Breads ==
Traditional Georgian breads are varied, and include Tonis Puri, Shotis Puri, Mesxuri Puri, Nazuki and Mchadi.

Georgian breads are traditionally baked in a large, round, well-shaped oven called a tone.

Shotis Puri in Tone

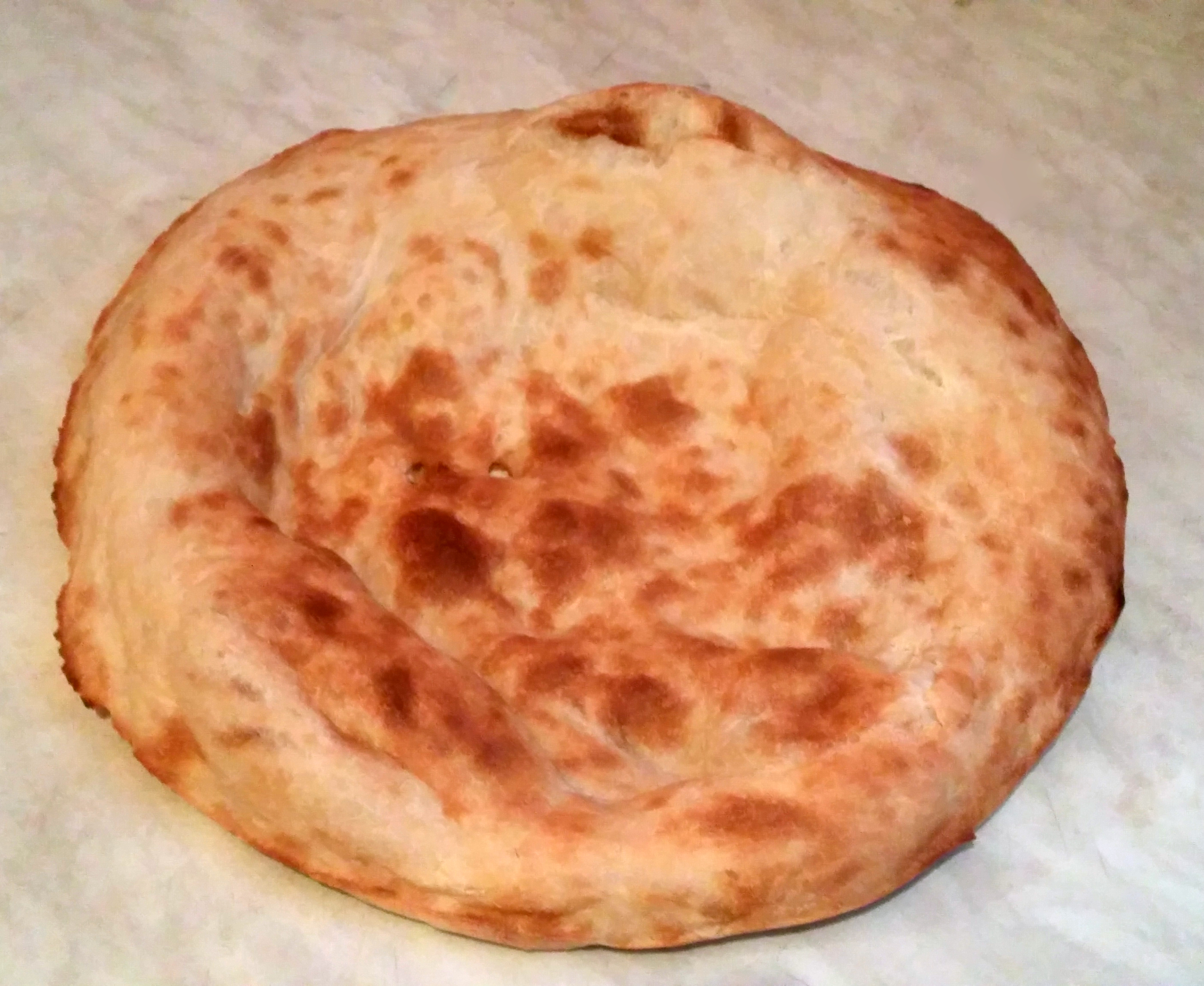
Traditional Tonis Puri

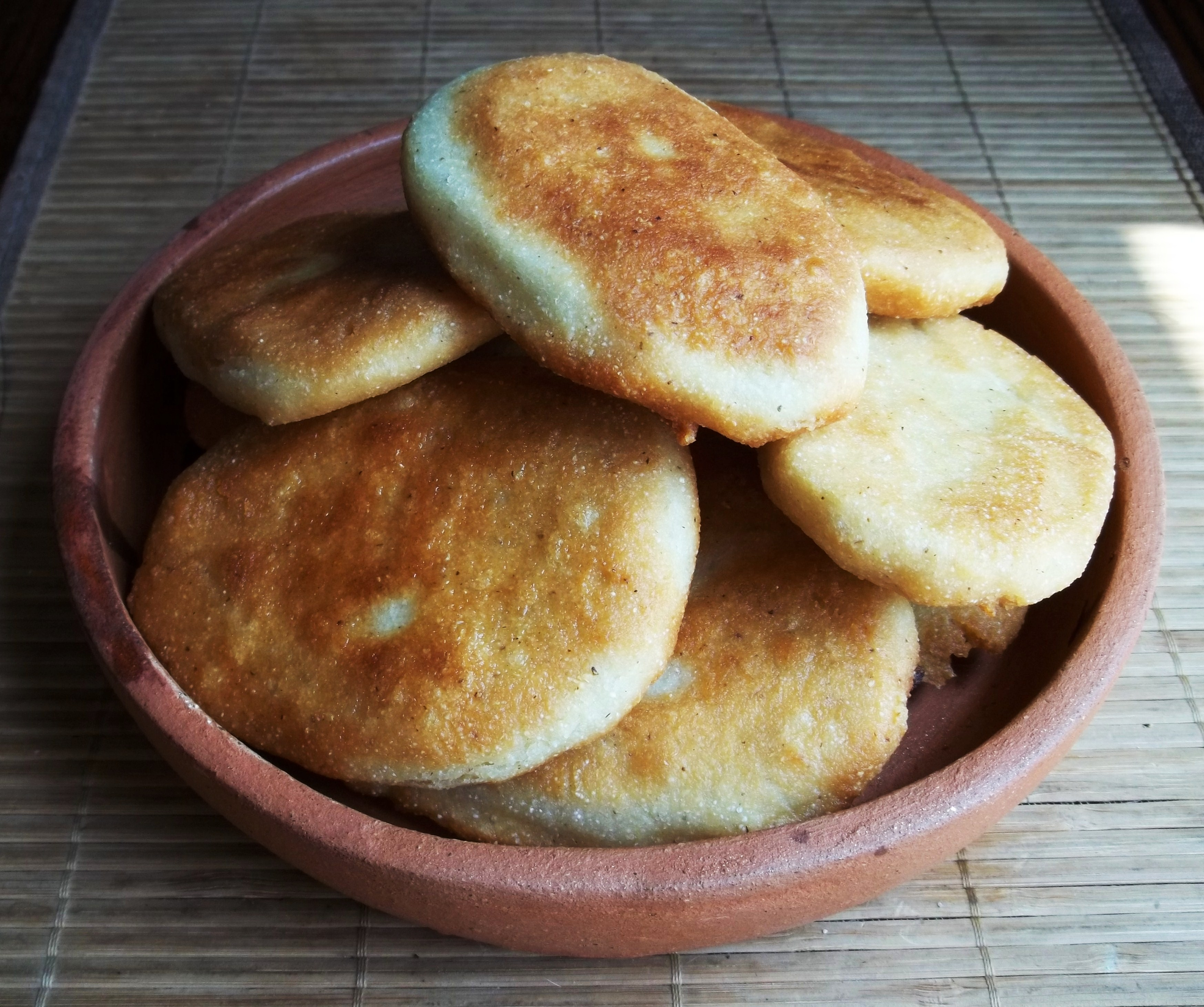
Mchadi

=== Khachapuri ===
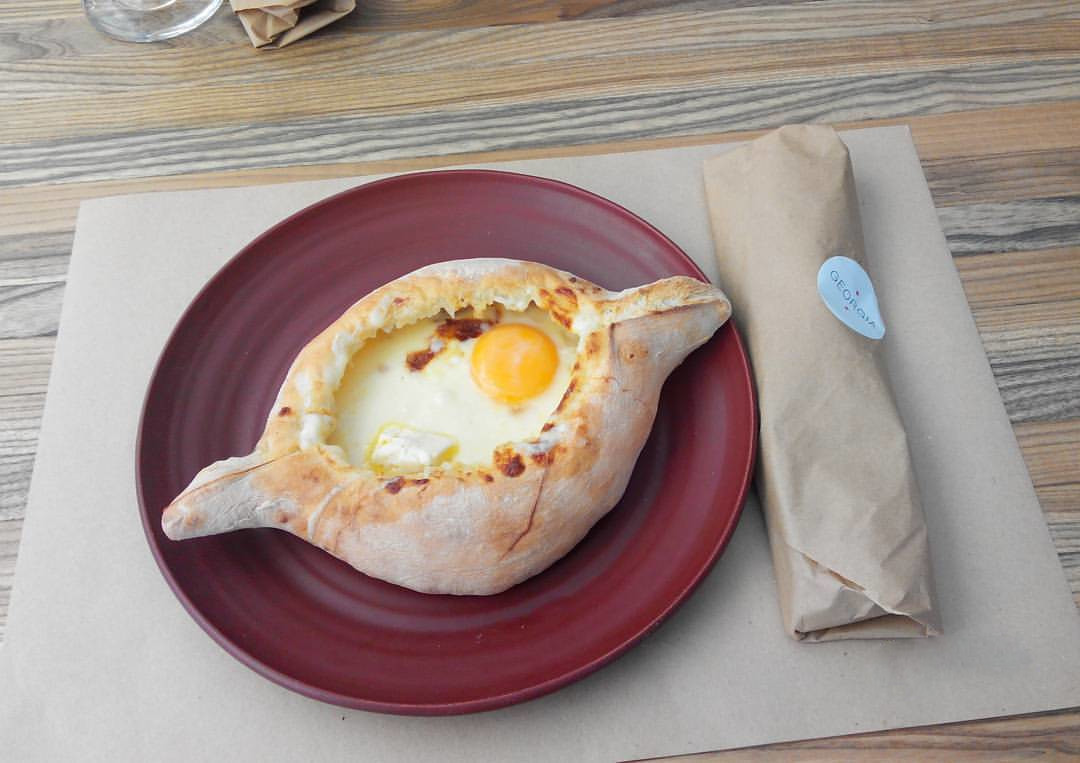
Adjarian khachapuri.

Khachapuri, also spelled as hachapuri, is a traditional Georgian dish of cheese (fresh or aged, most commonly sulguni), eggs and other ingredients.

There are several distinctive types of khachapuri in Georgian food from different regions of Georgia:

- Achma (აჩმა), from Abkhazia, which has multiple layers and looks more like a sauceless lasagna.
- Adjarian (Adjaruli / (აჭარული) Khachapuri, in which the dough is formed into an open boat shape and the hot pie is topped with a raw egg yolk and a pat of butter before serving.
- Chakhrakina (ჭახრაკინა) is a variation of Khachapuri made in Kartli and in Racha. It is filled with cheese and beets leaves.
- Kotori (კოტორი) is a Khachapuri made in Tusheti. The dough should be as thin as possible; and the filling consists of Kalti (კალტი - a sort of cottage cheese made in the region) and ghee.
- Gurian (Guruli / (გურული) Khachapuri has boiled eggs inside the dough and looks like a calzone. Arguably, it is not a type of khachapuri. Gurians make them for Christmas and call them simply 'Christmas pie'. In the rest of Georgia, it is called 'Gurian pie'.
- Imeretian (Imeruli / (იმერული) Khachapuri, which is circular and probably the most common type.
- Lemzira (ლემზირა) is a Svanetian ritual cheese bread mostly made in a round or triangular shape.
- Mingrelian Khachapuri also called "Megruli" (მეგრული), similar to Imeretian but with more cheese added on top.
- Meskhuri Khachapuri (მესხური) is a Khachapuri made of puff pastry dough and cheese. Lard is added in the dough and filling which give it a distinct taste from the more widespread Penovani Khachapuri. It is made in Meskheti.
- Ossetian Khachapuri also called "Osuri" (ოსური) or by its original name "Khabizgina" (ხაბიზგინა) is a version of Khachapuri which has potato, as well as cheese in its filling.
- Petvraali (ფეტვრაალი) is a sort of Khachapuri filled with cheese and millet, made in Svaneti.
- Penovani Khachapuri (ფენოვანი) is made with puff pastry dough, resulting in a flaky variety of the pie. It is often sold as street food in local bakeries.
- Pkhlovana or Mkhlovana (მხლოვანა / ფხლოვანა) is a Khachapuri made in the mountainous areas of Georgia, especially Khevi. It is similar to Chakhrakina but spinach is also added in the filling.
- Rachuli Khachapuri also called “Bachuli” (რაჭული / ბაჭული) is a version of Khachapuri made in Racha. It is filled with cheese and is of rectangular shape and puff pastry dough is used.

== Cheeses ==
Dambalkhacho cheese.

- Adjaruli Chechili (აჭარული ჩეჩილი): Cheese made in Adjara from cow milk, which is shaped into ropes.
- Chogi (ჩოგი): Cheese made from sheep milk in Tusheti.
- Chkinti' (ჭყინტი): Salty and juicy cheese made originally in Imereti.
- Dambalkhacho (დამბალხაჭო): Moldy cheese made in Pshavi and Mtiuleti. It is considered one of the most ancient and expensive cheeses.
- Dampali Kveli (დამპალი ყველი): Rare cheese with a butter filling inside.
- Kartuli (ქართული): Cheese made from a mixture of around 50% cow milk and a mixture of sheep, goat or buffalo milk.
- Guda cheese (გუდა): Cheese made from sheep milk in Tusheti. Its preparation lasts 20 days.
- Imeruli (იმერული): Cheese made in the region of Imereti from cow milk.
- Kalti (კალტი): Cheese made in mountainous regions of Georgia. It is often considered a shepherds' cheese because of its nutritional values.
- Kobi (კობი): Mixed cow/sheep milk cheese, mostly eaten in Eastern Georgia.
- Meskhuri Chechili (მესხური ჩეჩილი): Cheese made in Meskheti and same as the Adjarian one.
- Narchvi (ნარჩვი): Cheese made in Svaneti. It is shaped in curds.
- Sulguni (სულგუნი): One of the most famous cheeses in Georgia, which comes from Mingrelia. It is made from cow or buffalo milk. Outside Mingrelia, it is also made in Svaneti.
- Tenili (ტენილი): Cheese made in Samtskhe-Javakheti. It is shaped in curds.

== Salads ==
- Kitri pomidvris salata (კიტრი პომიდვრის სალათა): Cucumber and tomato salad with Georgian herbs, greens and Kakhetian oil (კახური ზეთი). It is sometimes eaten with a walnut sauce.
- Ispanakhis salata (ისპანახის სალათა): Spinach salad.
- Pkhali (ფხალი): Minced vegetables in a ball shape. It is mainly made from spinach, cabbage or beans and is topped with pomegranate seeds.
- Sagazapkhulo salata (საგაზაფხულო სალათა): Salad made during spring. There is not a strict recipe but it is mostly made of fresh ingredients and boiled eggs.
- Satatsuris salata (სატაცურის სალათა): Salad made of asparagus.
- Tcharkhlis salata (ჭარხლის სალათა): Salad made of beets.

== Soups and stews ==
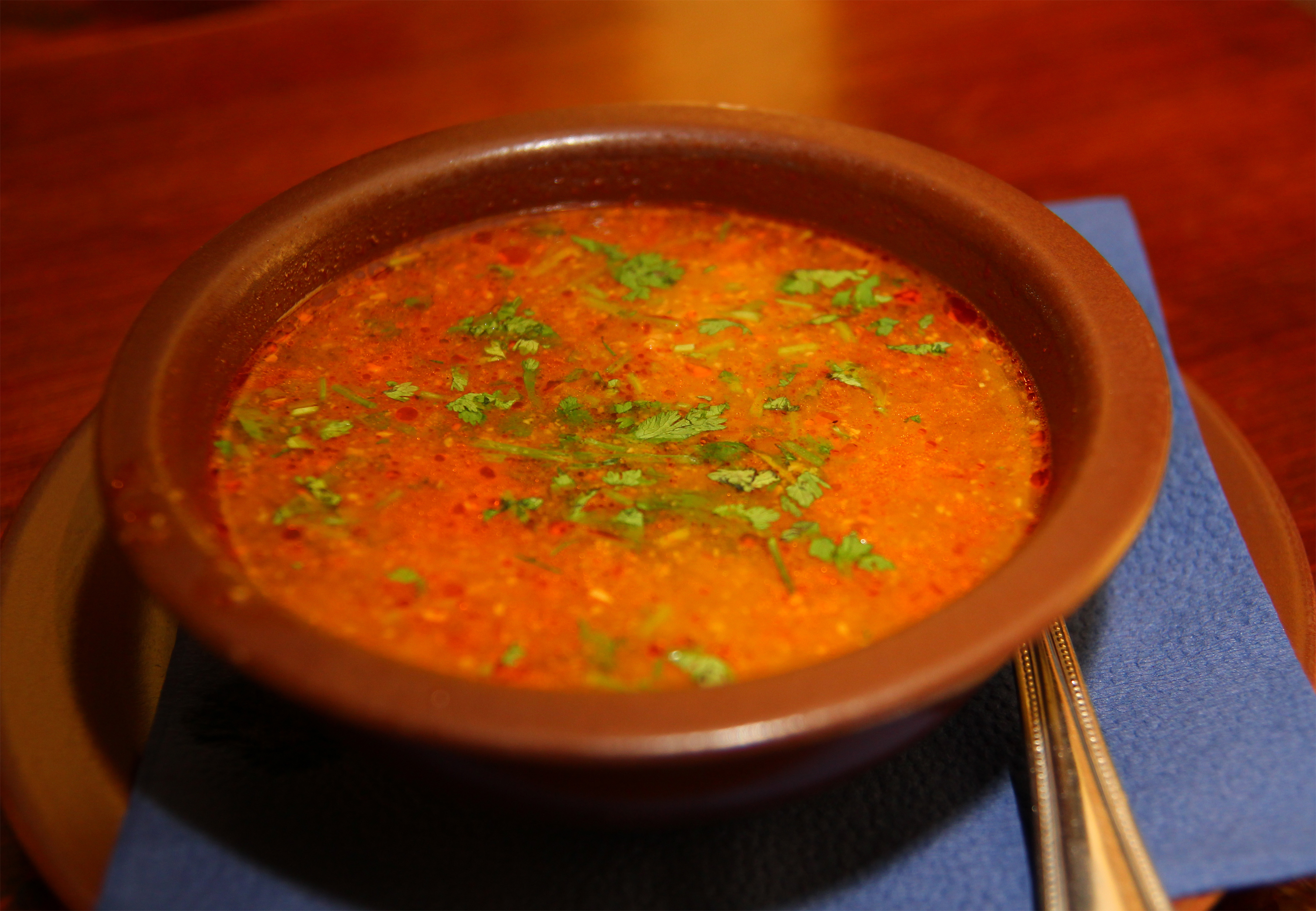
Kharcho

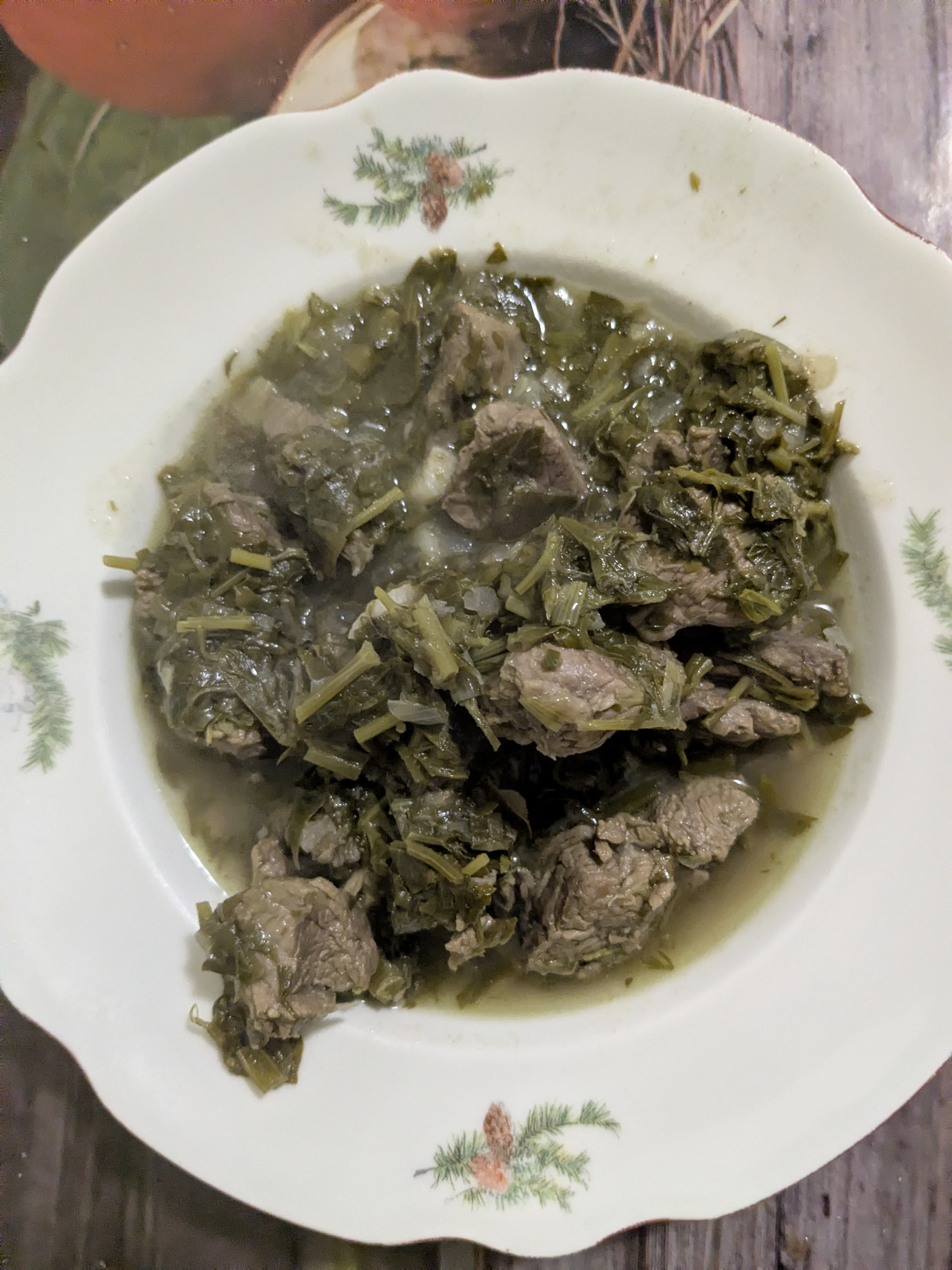
Chakapuli

- Chakapuli (ჩაქაფული): Stew made of lamb or beef (or veal), tarragon and cherry plums in Eastern Georgia (Kakheti and Kartli).
- Chakhokhbili (ჩახოხბილი): Soup made of tomatoes and poultry meat (mostly chicken or turkey) which originated in Western Georgia.
- Chikhirtma (ჩიხირთმა): Soup made of turkey or chicken meat and eggs which is traditionally made in Kakheti.
- Kharcho (ხარჩო): Soup made of beef, rice, cherry plums and walnuts from Mingrelia.
- Kharshil (ხარშილ): Soup made of spinach in Svaneti.
- Khashi (ხაში): Boiled cow or sheep parts in their juice. Mostly made in the Eastern regions, especially Kakheti.
- Lobio (ლობიო): Stew made mostly from kidney beans. Popular in Western Georgia.
- Matsvnis Supi (მაწვნის სუპი): Soup made mainly of Matsoni.
- Puris Kharcho (პურის ხარჩო): Soup made of bread. It originated in Kartli.
- Shechamandi (შეჭამანდი): Different sorts of soup made by a principle ingredients, mostly made in Kartli. These soups can be made of spinach, malva, garlic, dogwood, grains, sorrel, pink peavine and other ingredients.

== Fish ==
Though Georgian cuisine is not very fish-oriented, there are still some dishes mainly made of trout, catfish and carp:

- Kalmakhis Kubdari (კალმახის კუბდარი): Kubdari filled with minced trout, onions, coriander and ajika.
- Kapchoni Mchkudi (ქაფჩონი მჭკუდი): Cornbread made with anchovy, which is made in Adjara by the Lazs.
- Kepali (კეფალი): Fried flathead mullet.
- Kibo Kindzit (კიბო ქინძით): Lobster cooked with coriander.
- Kibo Mokharshuli (მოხარშული კიბო): Boiled lobster.
- Kibo Tetri Ghvinit (კიბო თეთრი ღვინით): Lobster cooked in white wine.
- Kobri Nigvzit da Brotseulit (კობრი ნიგვზით და ბროწეულით): Fried carp with walnuts and pomegranates seeds.
- Loko Kindzmarshi (ლოქო ქინძმარში): Boiled catfish with coriander and vinegar.
- Loko Tsiteli Ghvinit (ლოქო წითელი ღვინით): Boiled catfish in red wine.
- Tsvera Nigvzit da Brotseulit (წვერა ნიგვზით და ბროწეულით): Fried common barbel with walnuts and pomegranates seeds.
- Zutkhi Kaklis Potolshi (ზუთხი კაკლის ფოთოლში): sturgeon cooked in a walnut leaf.

== Meat ==
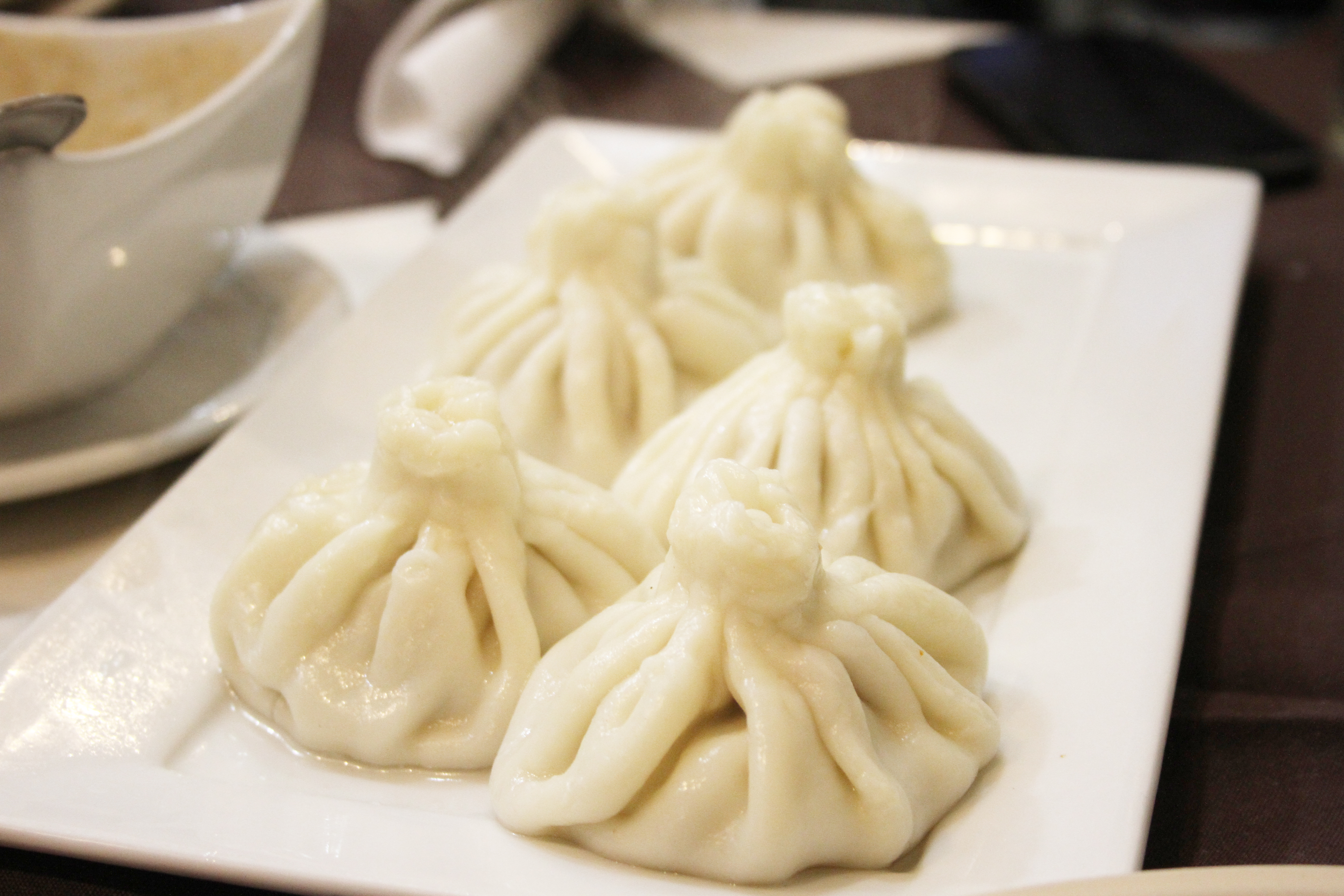
A plate of khinkali

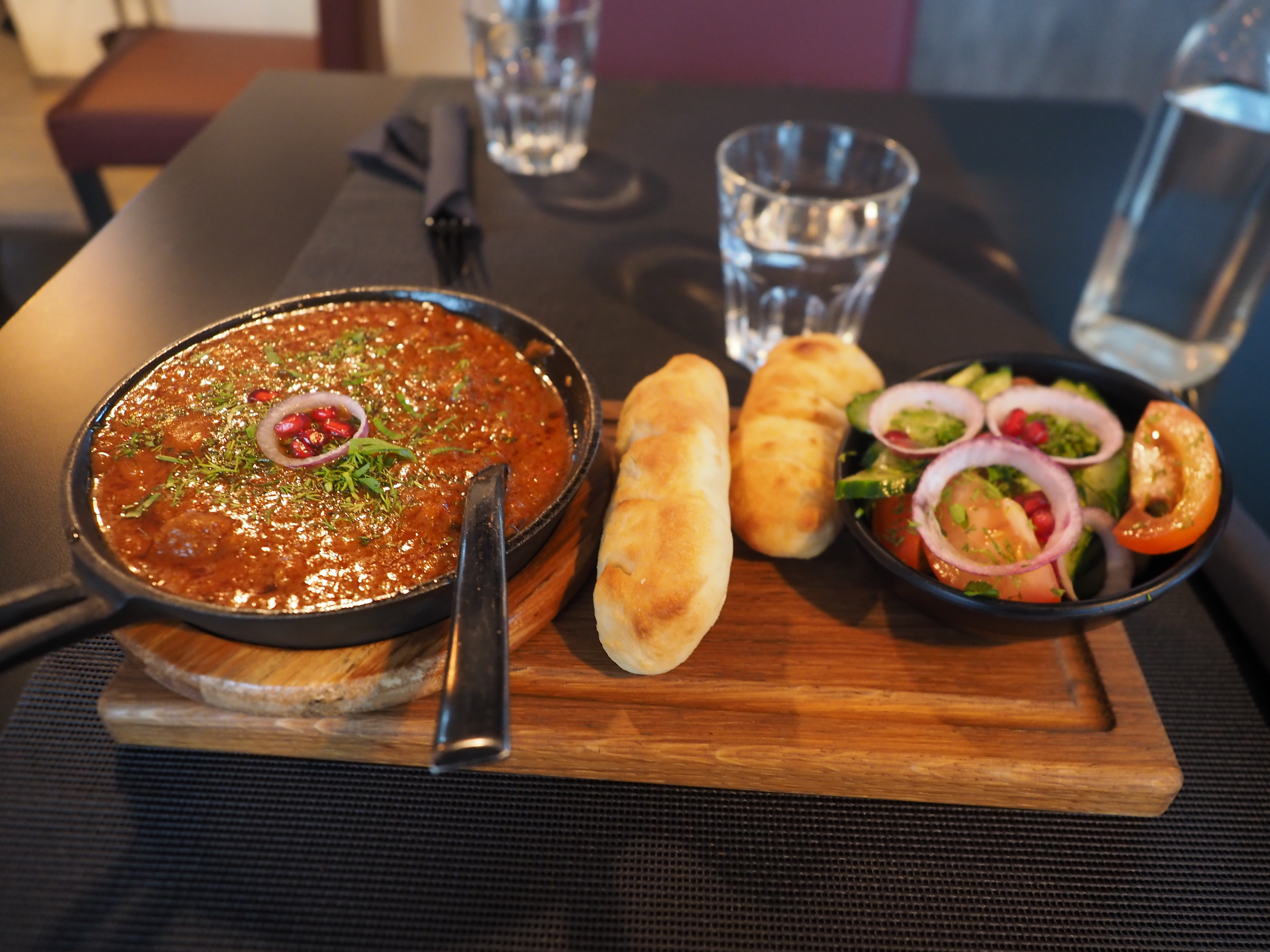
Chashushuli with bread and salad

The most popular Georgian meat dishes include:

- Abkhazura (აფხაზურა): Fried meat, often offal, rolled in caul fat from Abkhazia.
- Apokhti (აპოხტი): Dried or smoked meat (beef, lamb, goose, duck).
- Batis shechamandi (ბატის შეჭამანდი): Meskhetian soup made of goose meat.
- Bozbashi: Soup of lamb meat with peas, chestnuts and tomatoes.
- Chanakhi (ჩანახი): Soup made of tomatoes and lamb.
- Chakhokhbili (ჩახოხბილი): Soup made of tomatoes and poultry meat (chicken or turkey).
- Chakapuli (ჩაქაფული): Stew made of cherry plums, tarragon and meat (lamb, beef or veal) from Kakheti.
- Chashushuli (ჩაშუშული): Spicy beef stew with tomato base.
- Chikhirtma (ჩიხირთმა): Soup made of chicken and eggs from Kakheti.
- Gupta: Georgian version of kefta meatballs.
- Kharcho (ხარჩო): Soup made of beef, tomatoes, herbs and walnuts.
- Khash (ხაში): Boiled parts of cow or sheep in its juice.
- Khashlama (ხაშლამა): Boiled meat.
- Khinkali (ხინკალი): Dumplings filled with beef, pork or lamb meat (in Meskheti filled with goose) herbs from Eastern Georgia.
- Kubdari (კუბდარი): Khachapuri filled with meat from Svaneti.
- Kuchmachi (კუჭმაჭი): Fried chicken livers with walnuts and pomegranate seeds.
- Kupati (კუპატი): Fried sausage made of pork.
- Lori (ლორი): Smoked pork from Racha.
- Kababi (ქაბაბი): Meat cooked on fire, with pomegranate seeds.
- Mtsvadi (მწვადი): Meat cooked on fire.
- Muzhuzhi (მუჟუჟი): A kind of jelly filled with meat and vegetables (specifically carrots and other herbs).
- Qaghi (ყაღი): Smoked meat.
- Qaurma (ყაურმა): A kind of soup with chopped meat.
- Satsivi (საცივი): Poultry meat in a walnut sauce called bazhe which originated in Western Georgia.
- Shilaplavi (შილაფლავი): Pilaf made of lamb, spices, and vegetables.
- Shkmeruli (შქმერული): Chicken in a cream-based sauce.
- Tabaka (ტაბაკა): Roasted chicken with adjika.
- Tolma (ტოლმა): Georgian version of dolma. The filling is mostly meat and rolled in cabbage or grape leaves.
- Ziskhora (ზისხორა): Svanetian boiled blood sausage.

== Sauces and spices ==
Sauces and spices common in Georgian cuisine include:

- Adjika (აჯიკა): Spicy paste or sauce seasoned with hot chili peppers.
- Khmeli-suneli (ხმელი სუნელი): Powdered herb/spice mixture.
- Blue fenugreek (ულუმბო, უცხო სუნელი): Milder than regular fenugreek.
- Bazhe (ბაჟე): Walnut sauce.
- Coriander: Ground seeds
- Marigold: Also known as Georgian saffron. Orange powder with a light floral flavour used in walnut dishes
- Satsebeli (საწებელი): Spicy tomato sauce.
- Svanuri marili (სვანური მარილი): Salt from Svaneti mixed with spices.
- Tkemali (ტყემალი): Cherry plum sauce.

== Vegetarian dishes ==
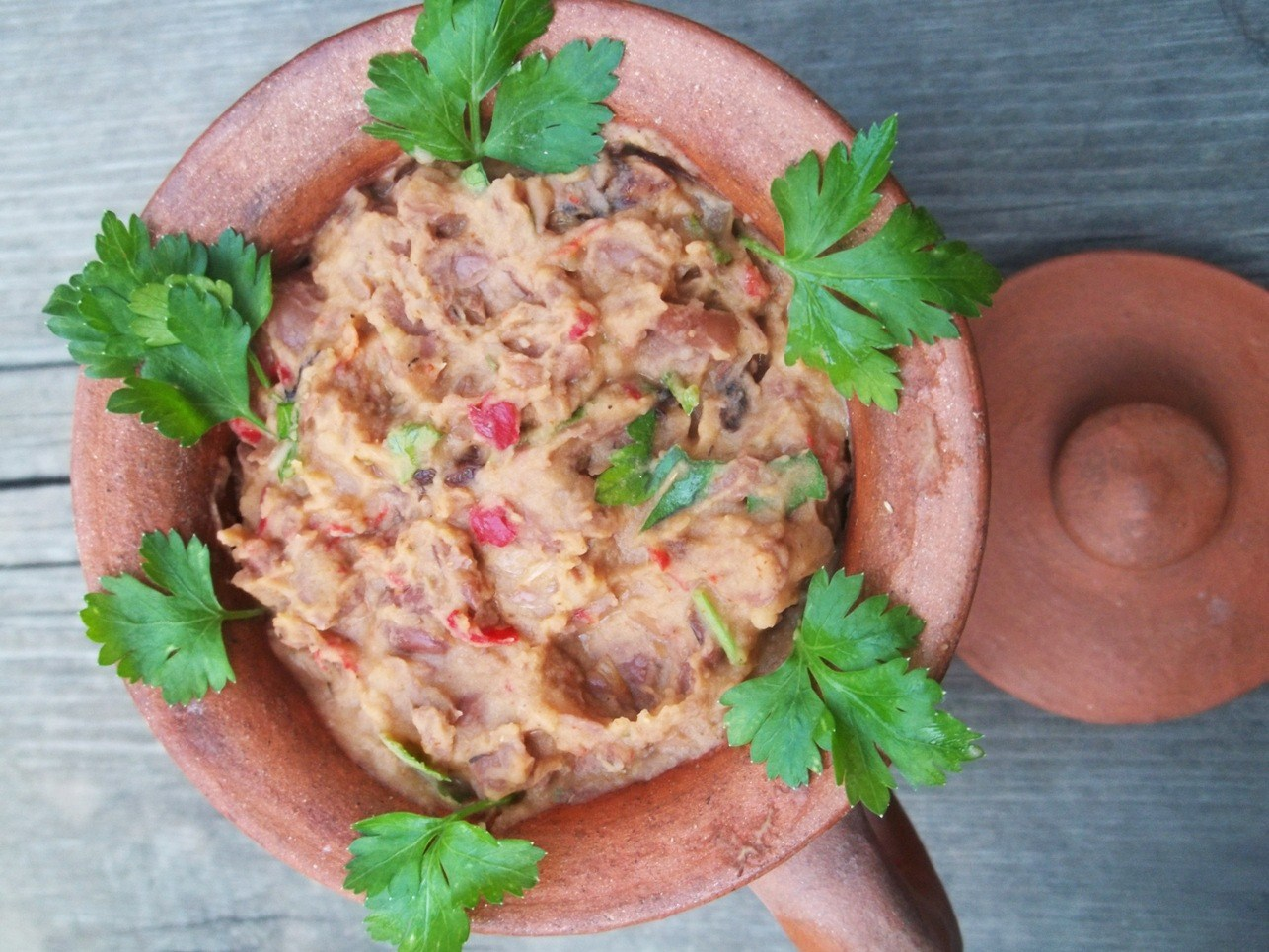
Lobio

- Ajapsandali (აჯაფსანდალი): Dish made of vegetables such as eggplant, potatoes, tomatoes, onions and herbs.
- Badrijnis borani (ბადრიჯნის ბორანი): Chopped and fried eggplant with spices.
- Badrijnis khizilala (ბადრიჯნის ხიზილალა - "eggplant caviar"): Chopped eggplant with pomegranate seeds and herbs.
- Badrijani mtsvanilit (ბადრიჯანი მწვანილით): Fried eggplant with fresh herbs (coriander, parsley and basil).
- Ekala nigvzit (ეკალა ნიგზვით): Smilax with walnuts.
- Gogris gupta (გოგრის გუფთა): Squash balls (vegetarian kefta).
- Lobiani (ლობიანი): Khachapuri filled with kidney beans.
- Lobio (ლობიო): Mashed kidney beans with spices.
- Lobio nigvzit (ლობიო ნიგვზით): Kidney beans with walnuts.
- Pkhali (ფხალი): Minced vegetables with pomegranates.
- Qnashi (ქნაში): Boiled minced pumpkin seeds which are later spiced and formed into a circle.
- Shechamandi (შეჭამანდი): Soup, mostly made in Kartli of spinach, malva, garlic, dogwood, grains, sorrel, pink peavine, and other plant ingredients.
- Sorrels and walnut soup (ღოლოს სუპი ნიგვზით): rumex-walnut soup.

== Desserts ==
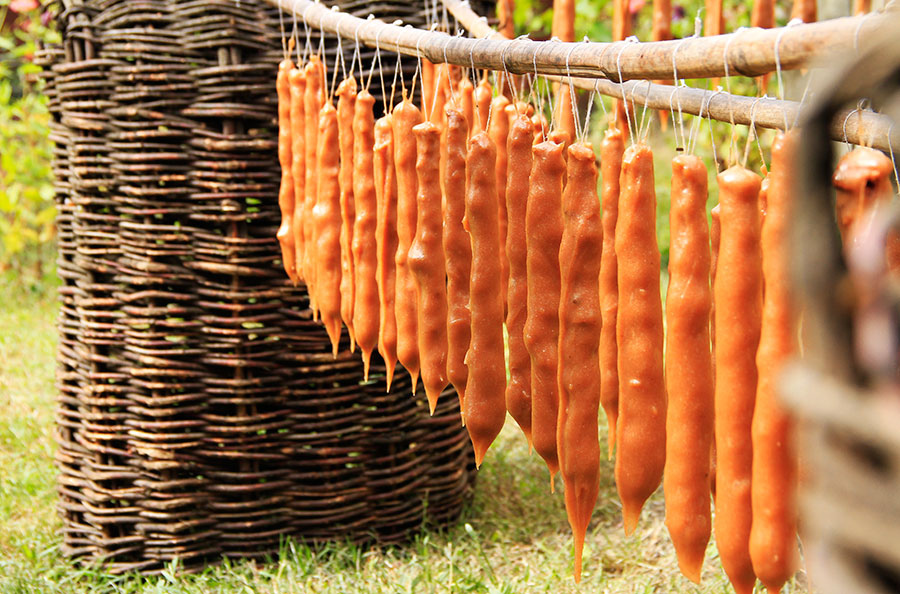
Churchkhela

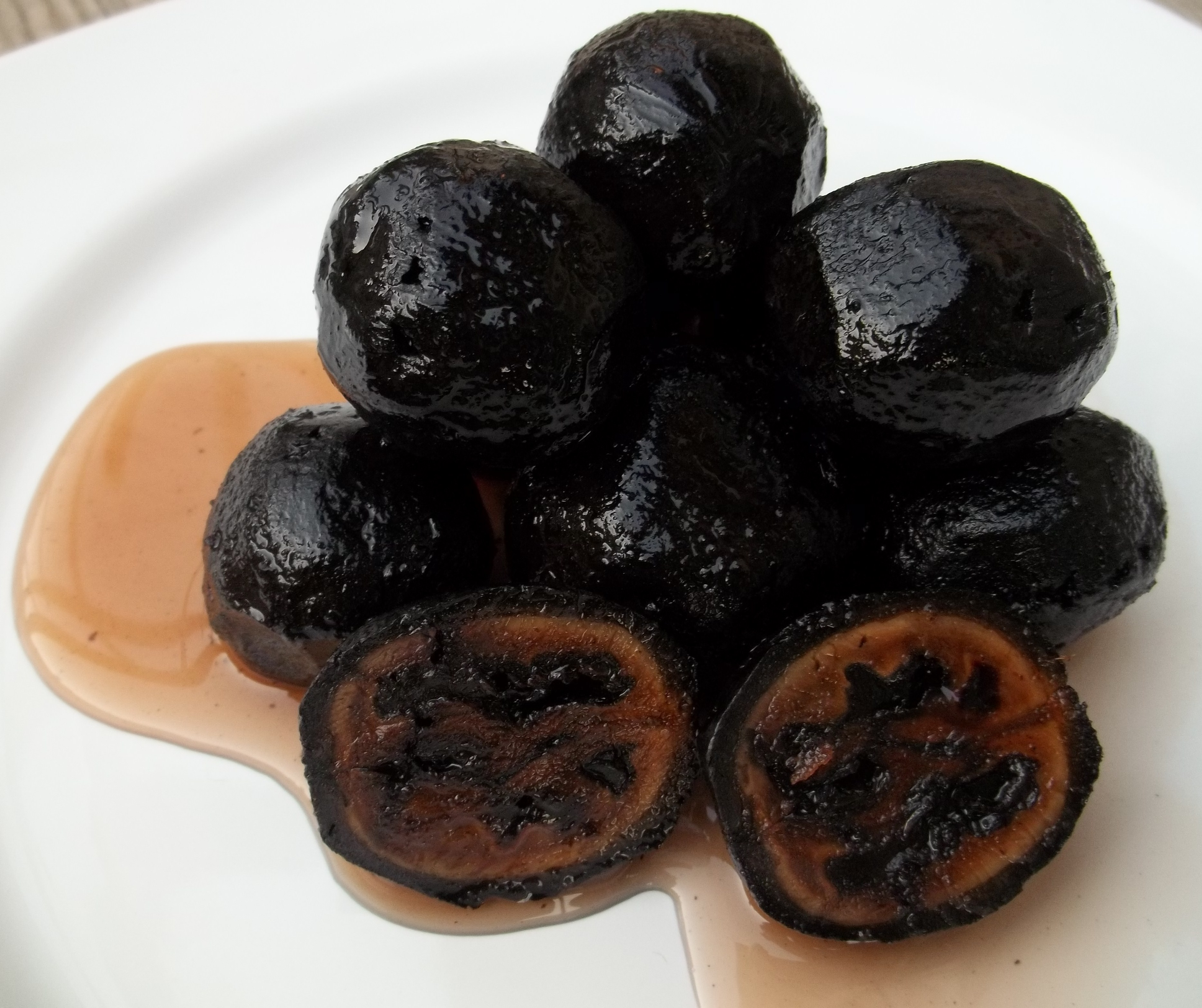
Muraba made from walnut

- Chiri (ჩირი): Dried fruits mostly apricots, grapes, plums and figs.
- Korkota (კორკოტა) is a porridge made by mixing soaked grains, honey, sugar, raisins and sometimes also walnuts together. It is often served at funerals.
- Churchkhela (ჩურჩხელა): Candy made of grape juice mixed with flour and walnuts. It originated in Kakheti.
- Janjukha (ჯანჯუხა): Same as Churchkhela but instead of walnuts, chopped hazelnuts are used. It is made in Guria.
- Gozinaki (გოზინაყი): Candy made mostly for New Year. It is made from chopped walnuts and honey.
- Muraba (მურაბა): Sort of jam made mostly from fruits such as walnut, watermelon, quince, fig, berries and from flowers (especially wild rose).
- Pelamushi (ფელამუში): Dessert made of grape juice and flour, similar to a sweet porridge.
- Tklapi (ტყლაპი): Is a type of Georgian fruit leather made with fruit purée, or excess juice of Churchkhela.

== Wine ==
Georgia is the oldest wine-producing region in the world. The fertile valleys and protective slopes of the Transcaucasia were home to grapevine cultivation and neolithic wine production (Georgian: ღვინო, ɣvino) for at least 8000 years. Due to the many millennia of wine in Georgian history and its prominent economic role, the traditions of wine are considered entwined with and inseparable from the national identity.

Among the best-known Georgian wine regions are Kakheti (further divided into the micro-regions of Telavi and Kvareli), Kartli, Imereti, Racha-Lechkhumi and Kvemo Svaneti, Adjara and Abkhazia.

UNESCO added the ancient traditional Georgian winemaking method using the Kvevri clay jars to the UNESCO Intangible Cultural Heritage Lists.

Alcoholic drinks from Georgia include chacha and wine (especially Georgian wine). Some of the most well-known Georgian wines include Pirosmani, Alazani, Akhasheni, Saperavi, and Kindzmarauli. Wine culture in Georgia dates back thousands of years, and many Georgian wines are made from traditional Georgian grape varieties that are little known in the West, such as Saperavi and Rkatsiteli. Georgian wine is well known throughout Eastern Europe, and is a significant national export, with exports of over 10 million bottles of wine per year. Georgia is also home to many beer brands, including Natakhtari, Kazbegi, Argo, Kasri, and Karva. There are also many craft beer brands such as Shavi Lomi, Megobrebi, NaturAle & Underground.

Lagidze water is a Georgian flavored soda drink, made with a variety of natural syrups, sold bottled or mixed directly in a glass from a soda fountain. Common types of mineral water from Georgia include Borjomi, Nabeghlavi, Likani, and Sairme.

== Popularity ==
Georgian cuisine is primarily popular in the post-Soviet states, although it also has been gaining popularity in the Western world in recent years. As such, American magazine Thrillist placed Georgian cuisine as the 4th among the indigenous cuisines of the 48 European countries.

In 2010, Georgian cuisine was described as having had an exotic appeal to Russians that The Independent compared to that of Indian cuisine to the British.

== See also ==
- Caucasian cuisine
- Ossetian cuisine
- European cuisine
