= Chikhirtma =

Traditional Georgian chicken soup

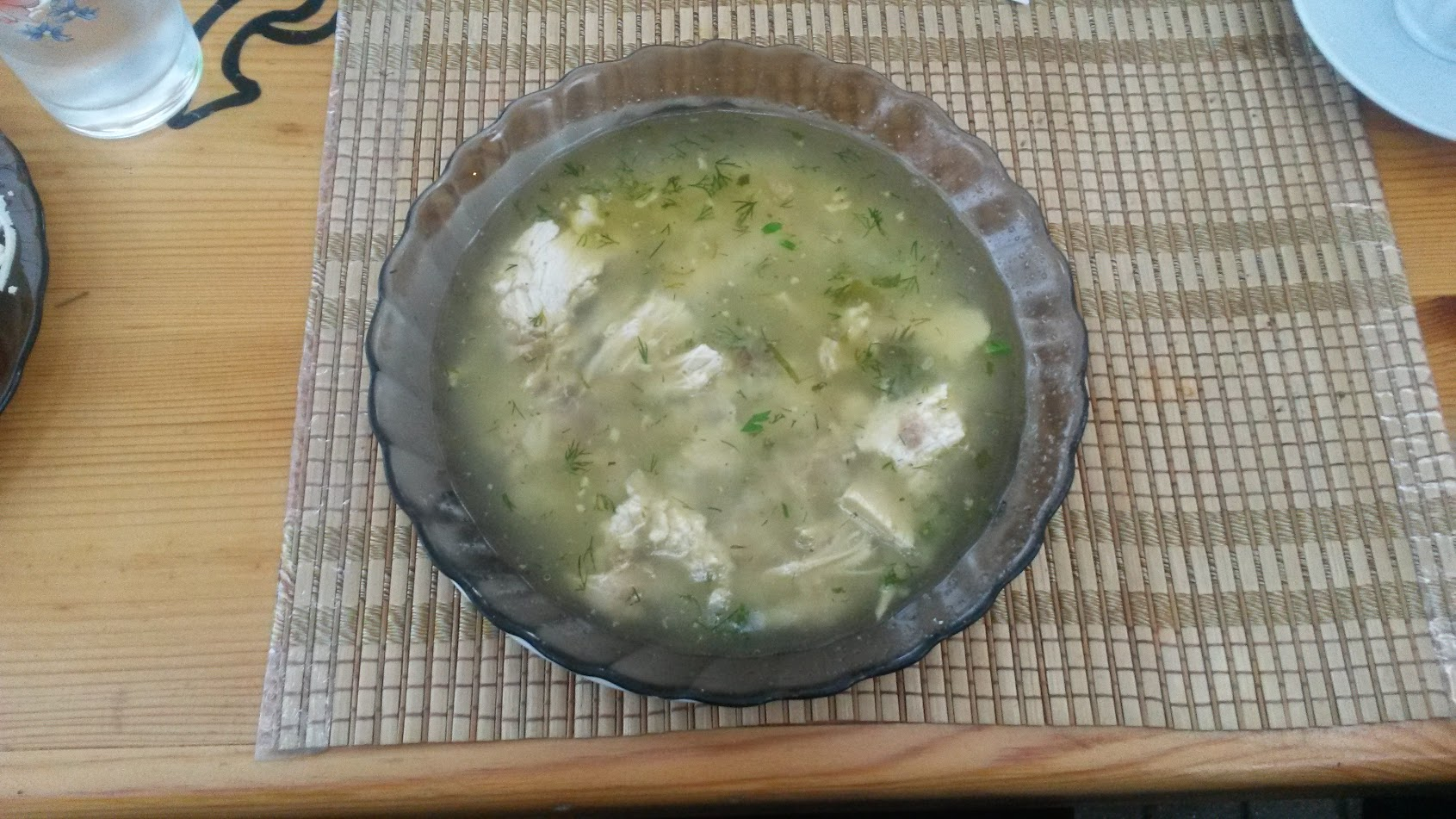
- A plate of chikhirtma
- Type: Soup
- Course: Appetizer
- Place of origin: Georgia
- Main ingredients: Meat (turkey or chicken), eggs
- Variations: Chicken broth

Chikhirtma (Georgian: ჩიხირთმა, pronounced [t͡ʃʰiχiɾtʰma]) is a traditional Georgian soup. Chikhirtma is described as a soup almost completely without a vegetable base. It is made with chicken broth, thickened with beaten eggs (or only yolks).
