= Pelamushi =

Georgian dessert porridge

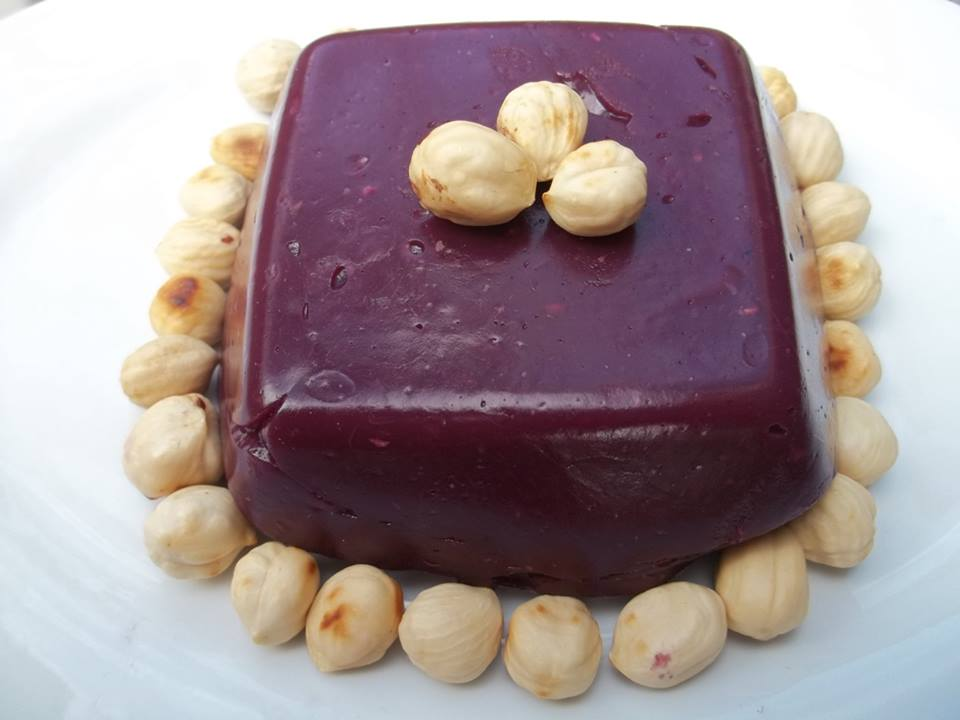
- Place of origin: Georgia

Pelamushi (Georgian: ფელამუში, pronounced [pʰeɫamuʃi]) or tatara (Georgian: თათარა) is a Georgian dessert porridge commonly made in autumn, composed of a thick, hard chilled jelly made from grape juice and flour. Pelamushi is usually served with peeled nuts or gozinaki.

== Preparation ==
Grape juice is boiled, and flour and/ or corn flour is added to thicken the mixture. Sugar may be added if a sweeter flavour is desired.

== Use ==
Pelamushi and nuts are used to prepare Churchkhela.
