= Kuchmachi =

Traditional Georgian dish

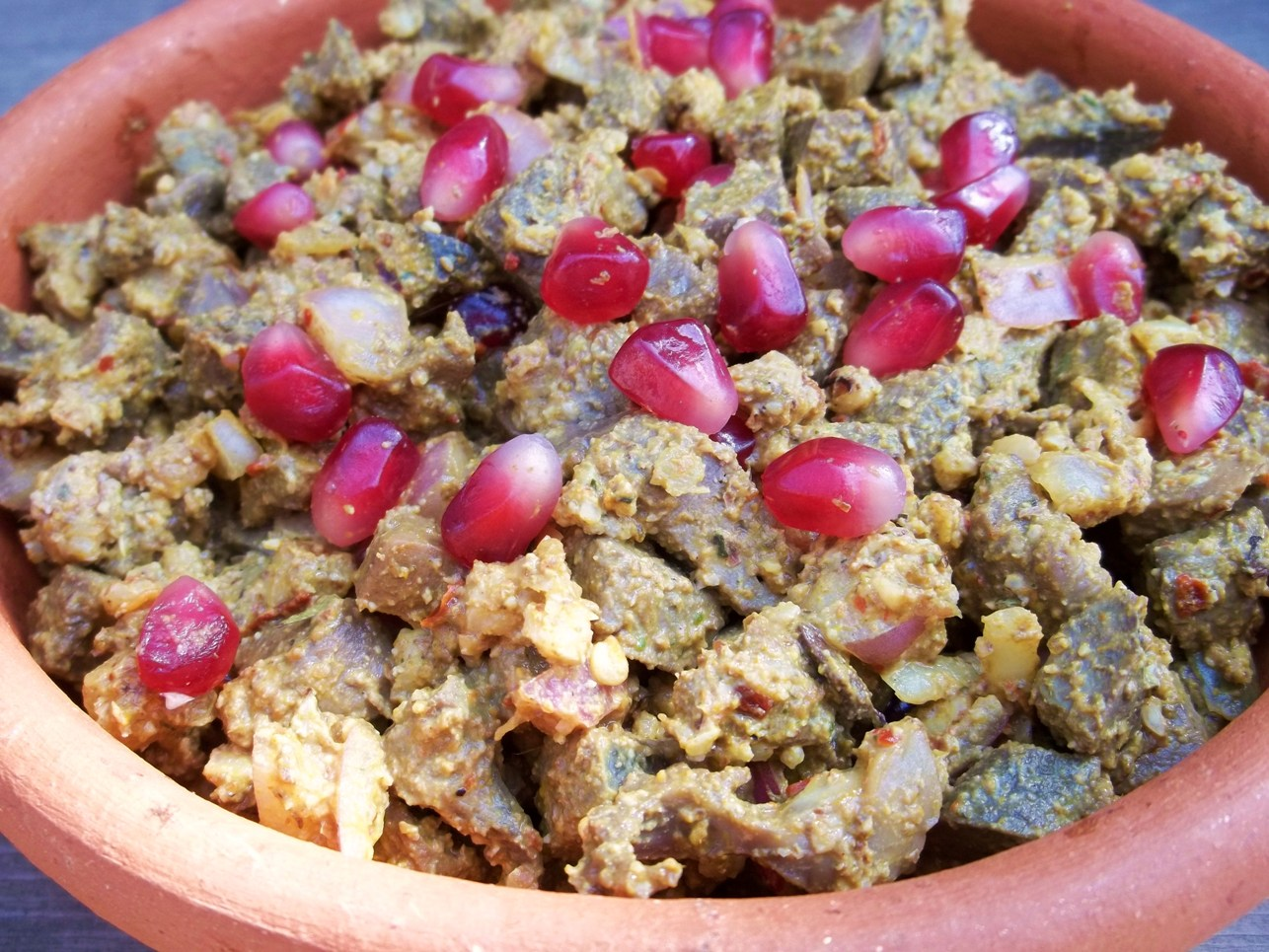
- Place of origin: Georgia
- Main ingredients: Chicken livers, hearts and gizzards with walnuts and pomegranate seeds

Kuchmachi (Georgian: კუჭმაჭი, pronounced [kʼut͡ʃʼmat͡ʃʼi]) is a traditional Georgian dish of chicken livers, hearts and gizzards with walnuts and pomegranate seeds for topping.
