= Khashlama =

Slow-cooked meat stew

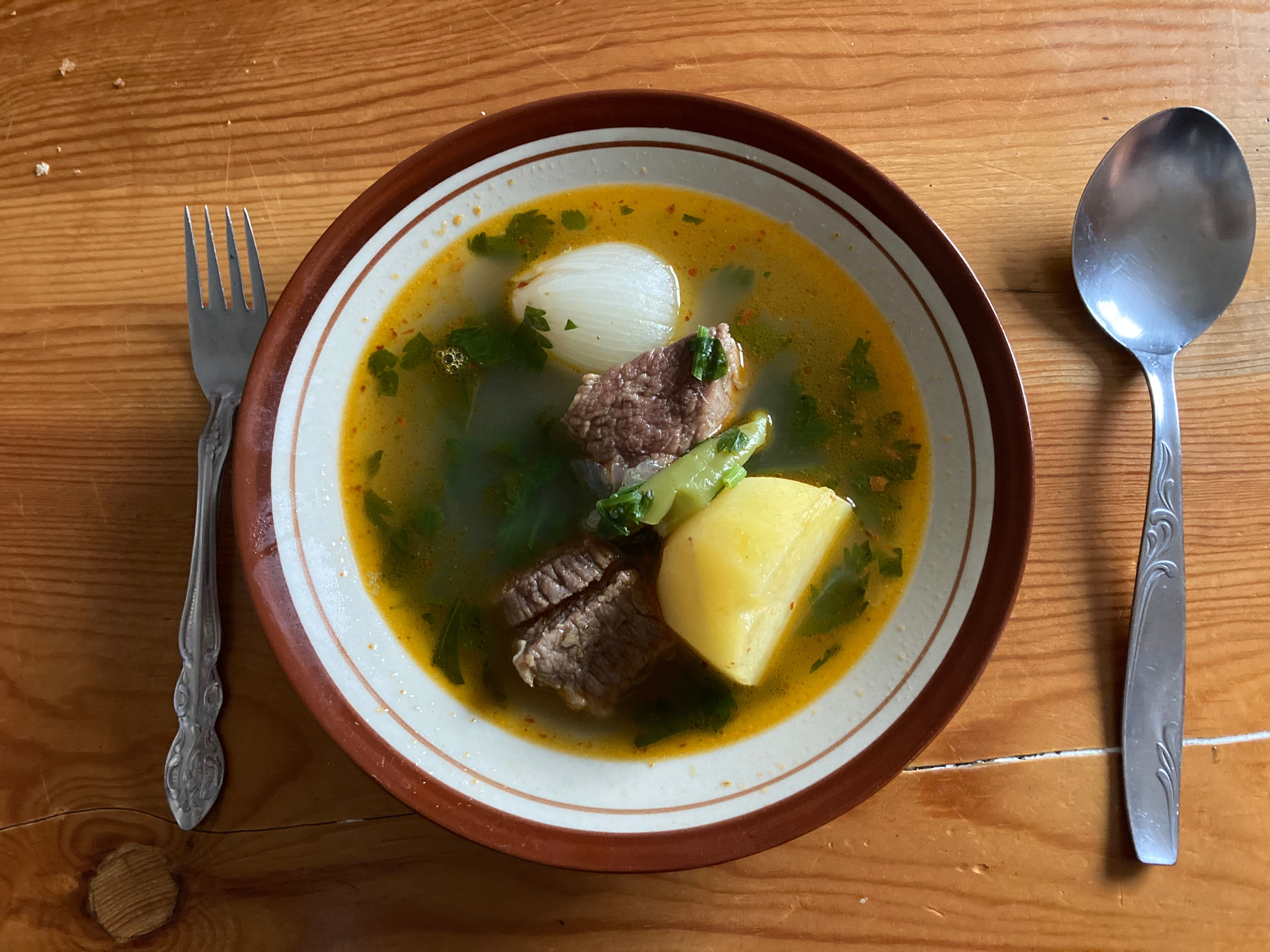
- Turkish kuzu haşlama with lamb, potato, and onion
- Alternative names: Haşlama, xaşlama, xašlama
- Type: Stew
- Region or state: South Caucasus and West Asia
- Serving temperature: Hot
- Main ingredients: Meat (beef or lamb), vegetables

Khashlama (Armenian: Խաշլամա; romanized: xašlama, Azerbaijani: xaşlama, Georgian: ხაშლამა; romanized: khashlama, Turkish: haşlama) is a traditional slow-cooked meat stew consisting of boiled lamb, mutton, or beef and vegetables, usually potatoes, carrots, bell peppers, and onions, seasoned with salt and herbs. It is a staple food in the South Caucasus and West Asia, particularly in Armenian, Azerbaijani, Georgian, and Turkish cuisine.

It is customary to either eat the meat first and drinking the broth afterward, or by serving the consommé as a first course followed by the meat as a second course. In Turkey, the dish is traditionally served with the avgolemono sauce.
