= Georgian bread =

Bread from the country of Georgia

Georgian bread is bread from the country of Georgia. პური (puri) means bread in Georgian. The bread is still baked in clay ovens called tonés. Bread is included in every Georgian meal. Varieties of Georgian bread include:

- Chvishtari
- Khachapuri
- Lavashi
- Lobiani
- Mchadi
- Nazuki
- Shotis puri
- Tonis puri
