= Ajapsandali =

Traditional eggplant dish

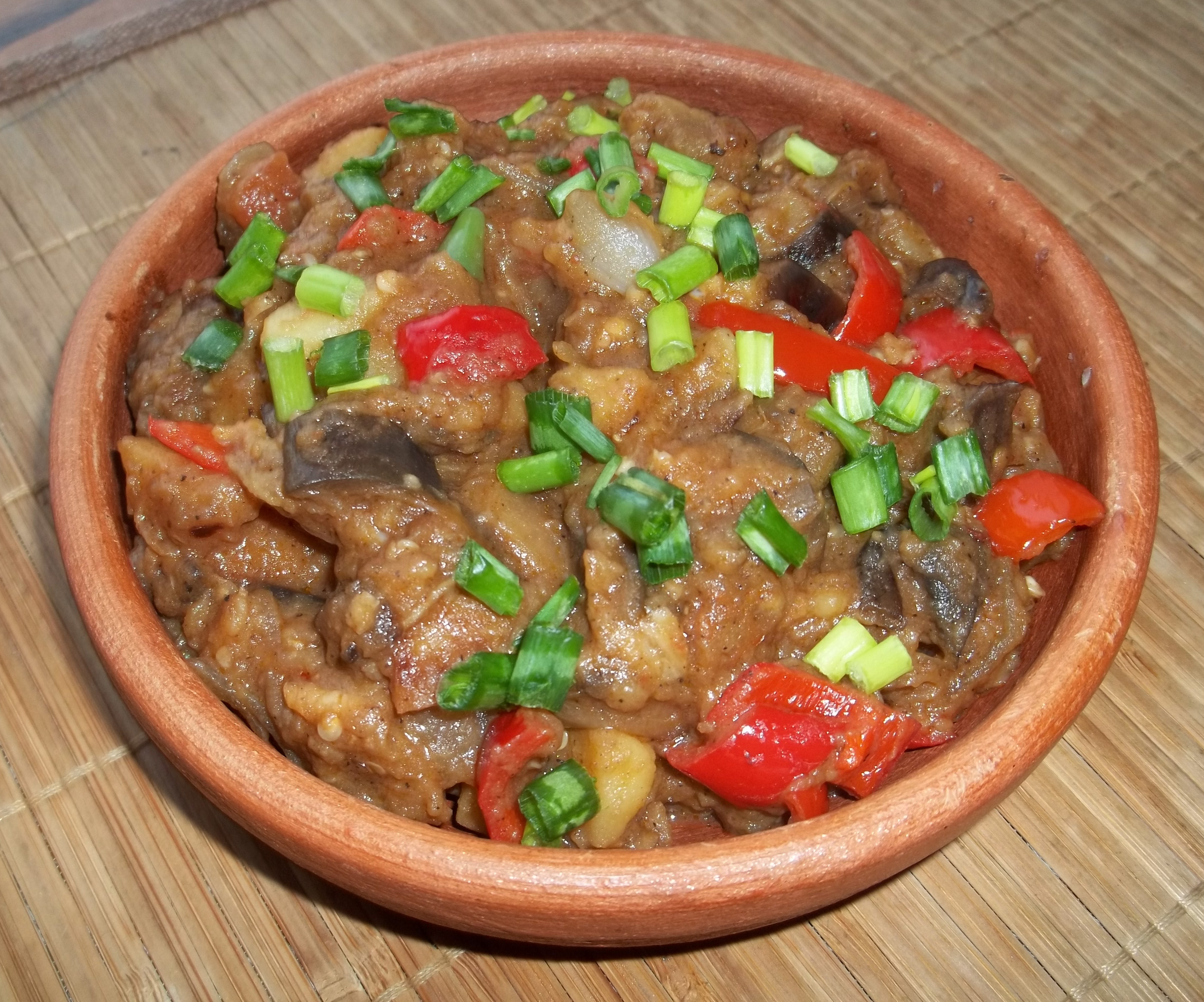
- Alternative names: Ajapsandal
- Place of origin: Armenia and Georgia
- Region or state: Caucasus
- Main ingredients: eggplant, potatoes, tomatoes, bell peppers, seasoning

Ajapsandali (Georgian: აჯაფსანდალი [ad͡ʒapʰsandali]), ajapsandal (Armenian: Աջափսանդալ [ɑd͡ʒɑpʰsɑnˈdɑl]) is a traditional Georgian and Armenian dish, also popular in the Northern Caucasus.

It consists of onion, eggplant, tomato and bell pepper grilled, stewed, or fried in vegetable oil and seasoned with garlic, basil, coriander leaves, parsley and other seasoning. Sometimes potato, chili pepper and carrots are added although traditional recipes do not include them.

The European counterpart of this dish is vegetable sauté or a ratatouille. However, ajapsandali is typically served cold.

== See also ==
- Caponata
- Khoresh bademjan
