= Kupati =

Georgian sausage

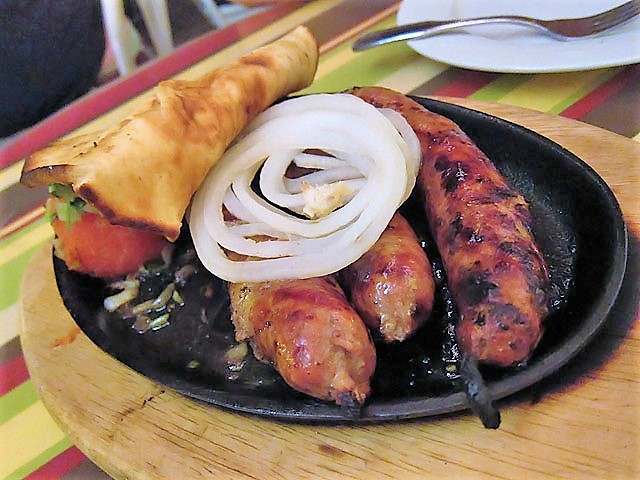
- Place of origin: Georgia

Kupati (Georgian: კუპატი, pronounced [kʼupʼatʼi]) is a type of Georgian sausage that is made from ground pork, intestines or chitterlings, pepper, onions. It is popular in the Caucasus region.

== See also ==
- List of sausages
