= Kubdari =

Georgian dish

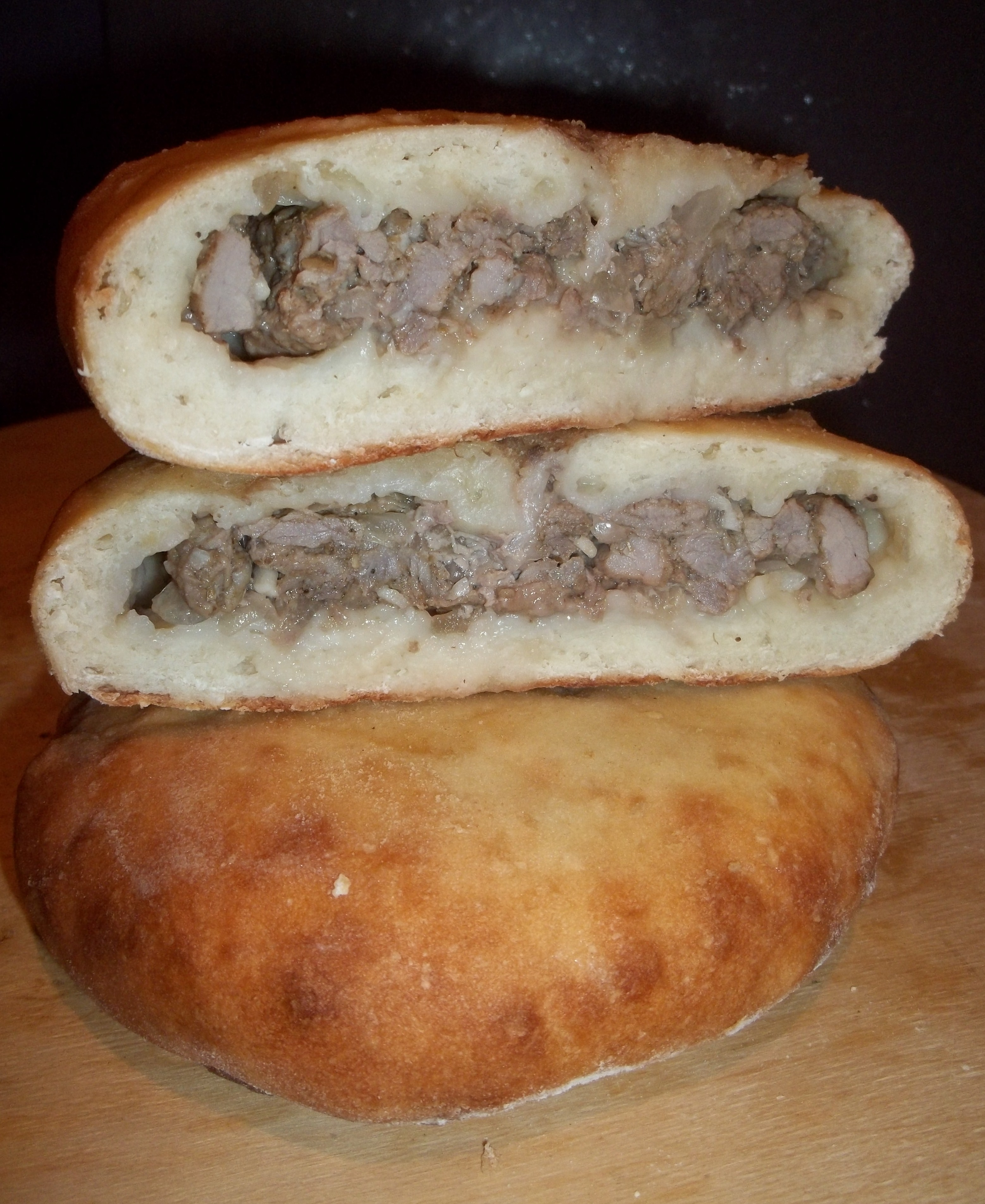
- Place of origin: Georgia
- Region or state: Svaneti
- Main ingredients: Bread, meat (lamb or kid or pork), spices, onions.

Kubdari or kubed (Georgian: კუბდარი, Svan: კუბედ) is a Georgian filled bread dish which is particularly a national dish of the Svans. The bread is leavened and allowed to rise. The filling contains chunks of meat, which can be lamb, kid or pork, Georgian spices and onions. Kubdari was inscribed on the Intangible Cultural Heritage of Georgia list in 2015.

== See also ==
- List of bread dishes
