= Muzhuzhi =

Traditional Georgian pork aspic

Muzhuzhi (Georgian: მუჟუჟი) is a traditional Georgian pork aspic. What makes muzhuzhi unique is that it's prepared from two components (legs and tails, and lean pork meat), which are processed in slightly different ways and then combined into one dish after being cooked. Both parts of the muzhuzhi are lightly marinated in wine vinegar infused with tarragon and basil. The vinegar should make up one-tenth of the volume of the broth poured over the finished muzhuzha. The dish is served cold a day after preparation, garnished with green onions and herbs. Muzhuzhi exists in both hot and cold versions.
