= Guruli gvezeli =

Georgian dish

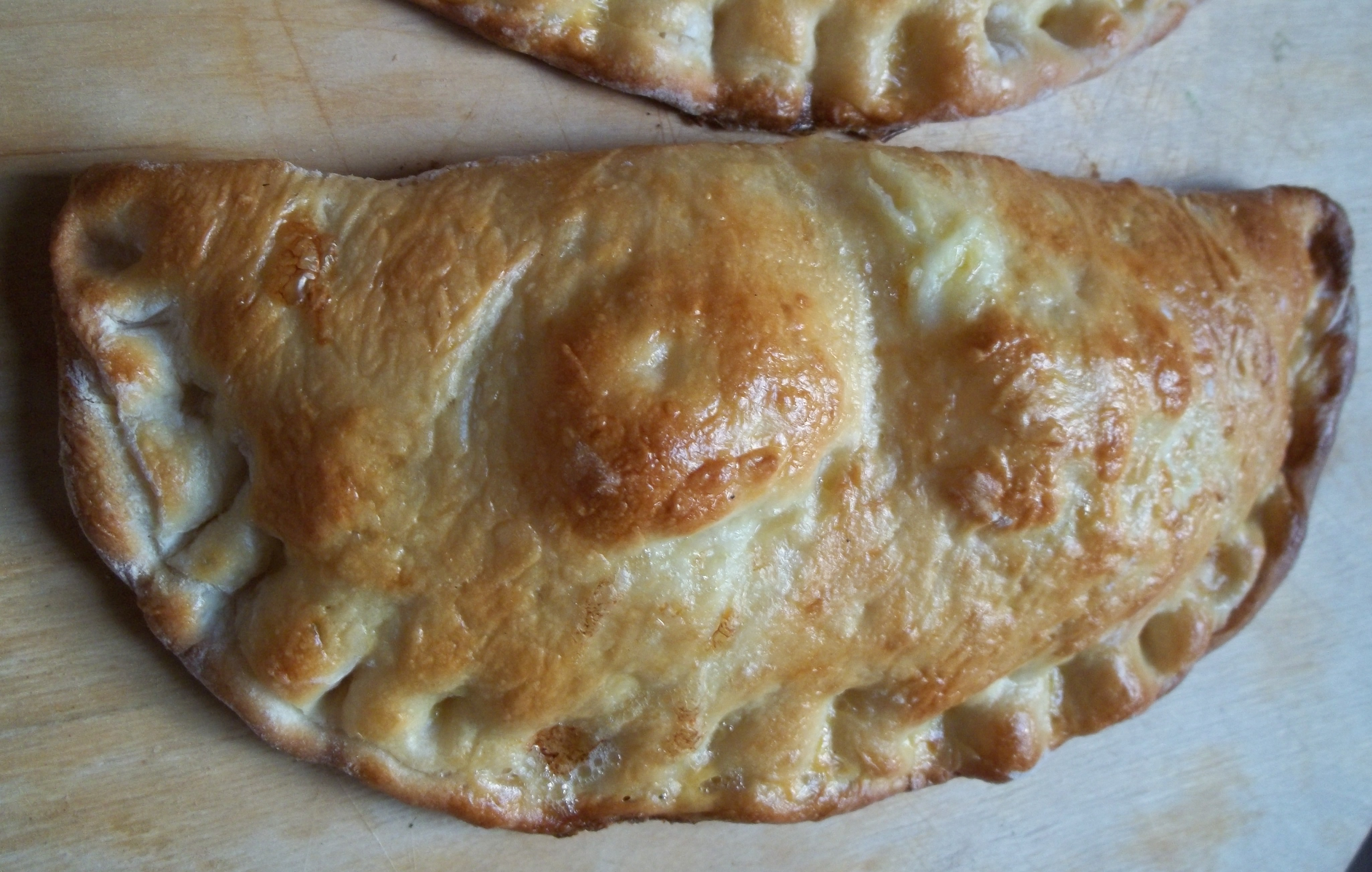
- Region or state: Guria, Georgia
- Main ingredients: cheese; eggs

Guruli gvezeli (Georgian: გურული ღვეზელი, romanized: guruli ghvezeli) (Note: It may also be referred as Gurian gvezeli or simply Ghvedzeli.) is a traditional Georgian crescent-shaped pie from Guria region of western Georgia. It is often served as a staple Christmas dish in Guria.

== History ==
Guruli gvezeli are prepared as a pie filled with cheese and hard-boiled eggs, and often baked in quantities matching the number of family members.

Well-cooked, peeled eggs would be placed in a basket or wrapped in a cloth and hung close to the fireplace, or sometimes over a fire, to smoke the eggs and give the flavor that makes the dish more delicious. Today, instead of smoking, hard-boiled eggs are fried in a greased pan or dried thoroughly in the oven.

Cheese is grated and the boiled eggs are cut in 4 pieces. Cheese is spread on one side by placing two pieces of egg in dough. The second half of the dough is folded over the top and the edges are sealed with fingers.

== See also ==
- Lobiani
- Khachapuri
