= Bazhe =

Walnut sauce from Georgian cuisine

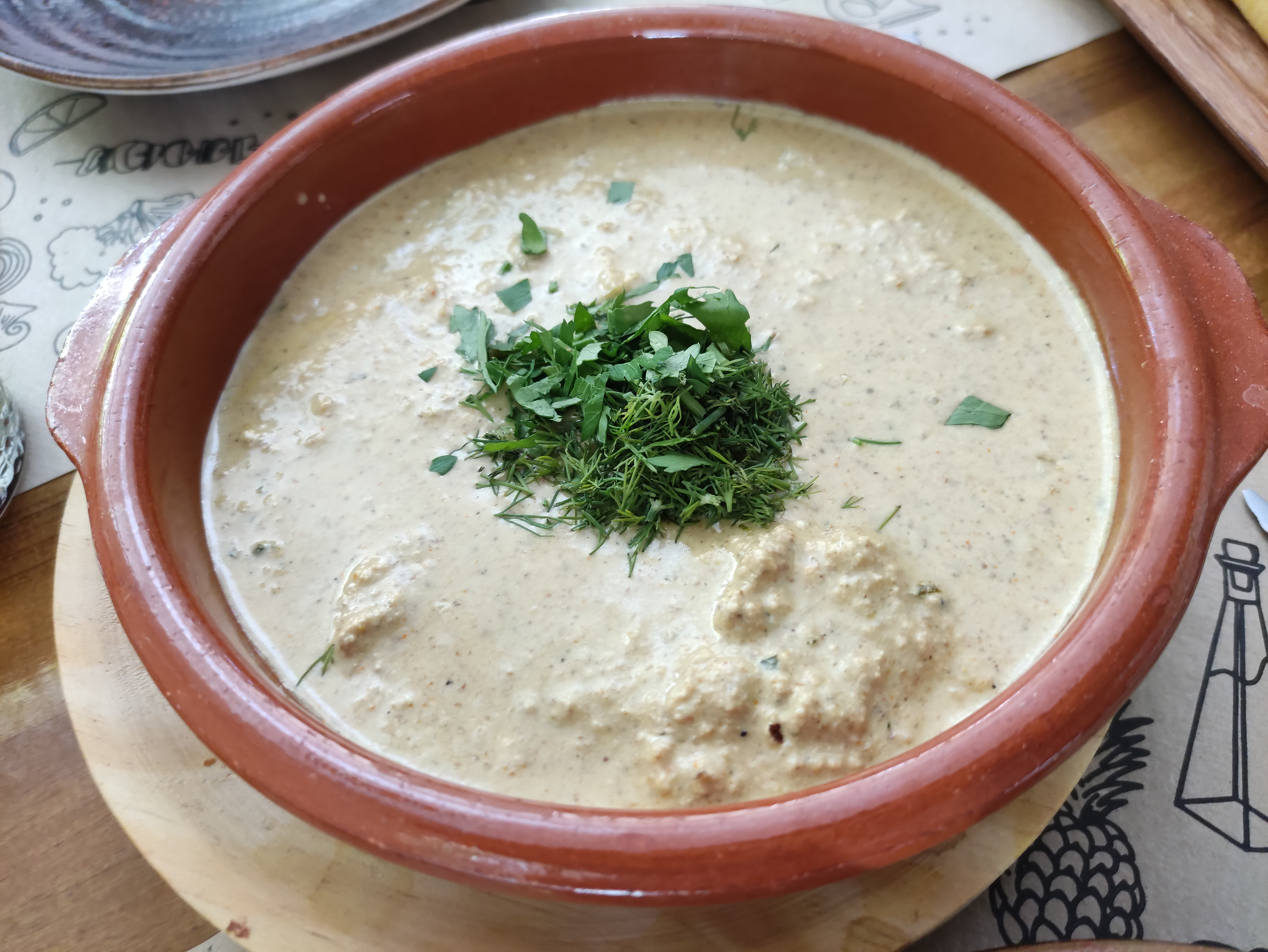
- Course: Sauce
- Place of origin: Georgia
- Main ingredients: Walnuts, garlic, vinegar, spices, water or broth

Bazhe (Georgian: ბაჟე, romanized: bazhe) is a traditional Georgian sauce made primarily from walnuts, which are a staple ingredient in Georgian cuisine. Bazhe sauce is typically used as an accompaniment to various dishes, especially poultry, and is known for its creamy texture and distinctive taste. Bazhe holds a significant place in Georgian culinary tradition.

== Ingredients ==
The primary ingredients of bazhe include:

- Walnuts: Ground walnuts form the base of the sauce
- Garlic: Adds a pungent and aromatic element.
- Vinegar: Typically wine vinegar, which imparts a tangy flavor.
- Water or broth: Used to adjust the consistency of the sauce.
- Spices: A combination of spices such as coriander, fenugreek, and marigold (also known as Georgian saffron) are commonly used.
- Salt and pepper: For seasoning.

Optional ingredients can include pomegranate juice or molasses for a hint of sweetness and additional depth of flavor.

The finished sauce is typically smooth, creamy, and flavorful, with a balance of nuttiness, tanginess, and spice.

== Uses ==
Bazhe is used in numerous Georgian dishes:

- Satsivi, which consists of poultry (usually chicken or turkey) cooked and served cold with bazhe sauce. This dish is especially popular during festive occasions and holidays.
- Vegetables: Bazhe can also be served with vegetables, such as eggplants or potatoes, either as a dip or a dressing.
- Dipping sauce: It serves as a dip for bread or as a sauce for grilled meats.
