= Satsebeli =

Tomato sauce in Georgian cuisine

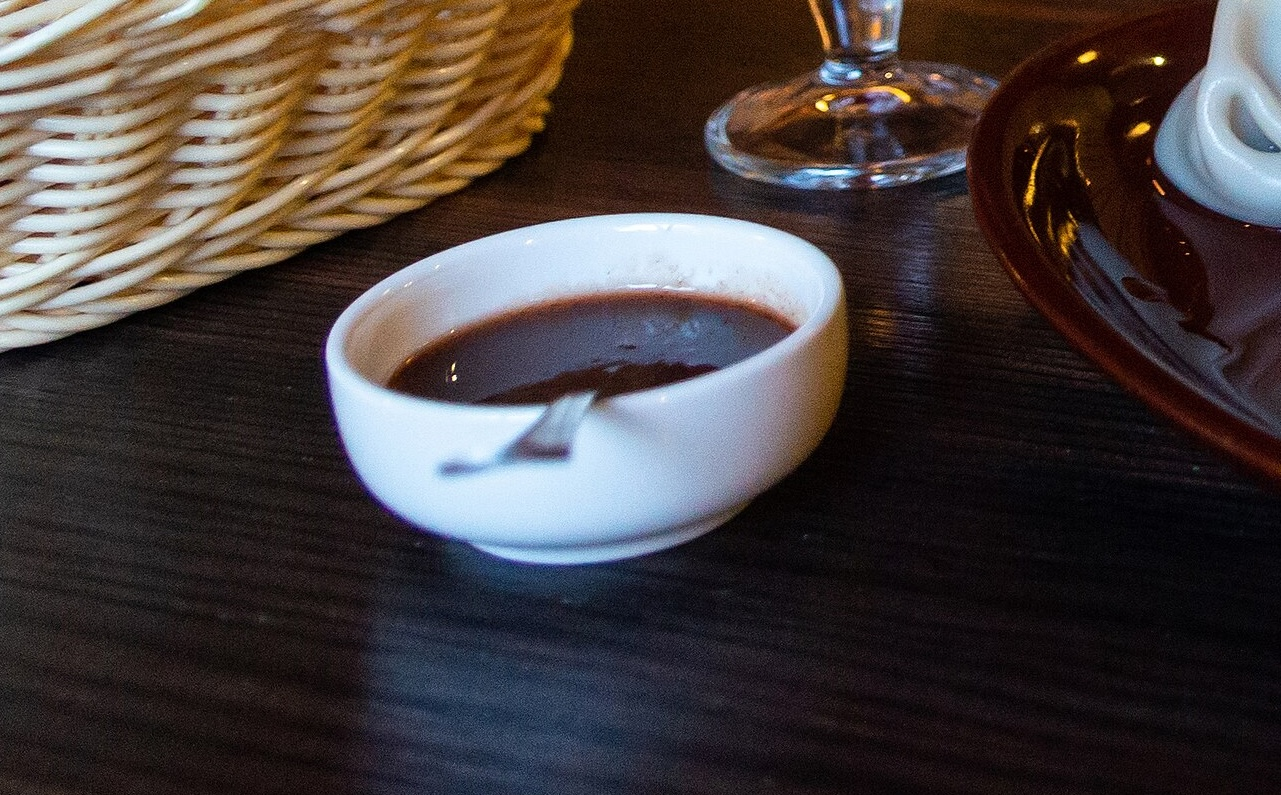
- Course: Sauce
- Place of origin: Georgia
- Main ingredients: tomato

Satsebeli (Georgian: საწებელი, lit. 'for dunking') is a thin spicy Georgian sauce made of tomato, garlic, vinegar, pepper, khmeli suneli (a traditional Georgian herb mixture), water and spicy ajika chili paste.

The sauce is made by chopping tomatoes and peppers, stewing and reducing them over a low heat, and adding salt for seasoning and preservation. It is intended to be a thin sauce, and water may added after cooking, or the sauce may be strained before using. It is traditionally made in large batches and stored to use throughout the winter under a thin layer of oil.

The sauce is paired with a variety of dishes. Roast chicken or lamb are common meat pairings, and it is also drizzled over eggs, or used as a dipping sauce for khinkali.

Satsebeli can also be used more generally as a term for a class of sauces based around sour fruit. These include not only the tomato (a botanical fruit), but also culinary fruits such as tkemali plums or pomegranates. When it is important to differentiate the tomato sauce from other sauces, it can be referred to as pomidvris satsebeli (Georgian: პომიდვრის საწებელი).

== See also ==
- List of sauces
