= Chakhokhbili =

Georgian chicken dish

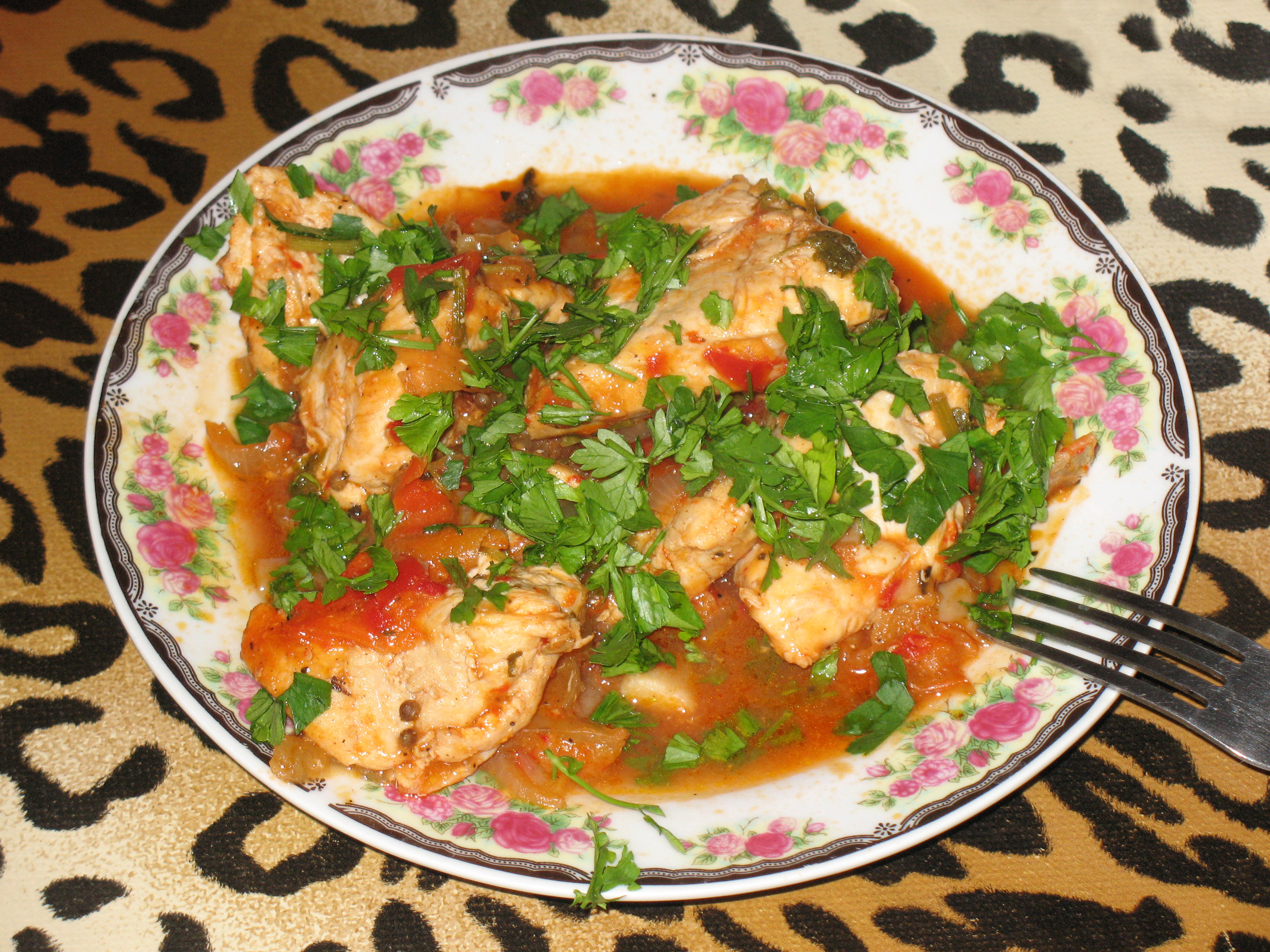
- ჩახოხბილი
- Type: Stew
- Course: Main course
- Place of origin: Georgia
- Region or state: Western Georgia
- Created by: Traditional dish
- Serving temperature: Hot
- Main ingredients: Chicken, tomatoes, onions, fresh herbs
- Variations: Pheasant or turkey instead of chicken
- Food energy (per serving): Varies
- Other information: Traditionally prepared by dry-frying the chicken without added oil

Chakhokhbili (Georgian: ჩახოხბილი, pronounced [t͡ʃʰaχoχbili]) is a traditional Georgian dish of stewed chicken and tomato with fresh herbs.

The characteristic feature of Chakhokhbili is to dry-fry chicken without adding any kind of oil.

Its name comes from the Georgian word ხოხობი (khokhobi) which means "pheasant".
