= Elarji =

Georgian cheese-based dish

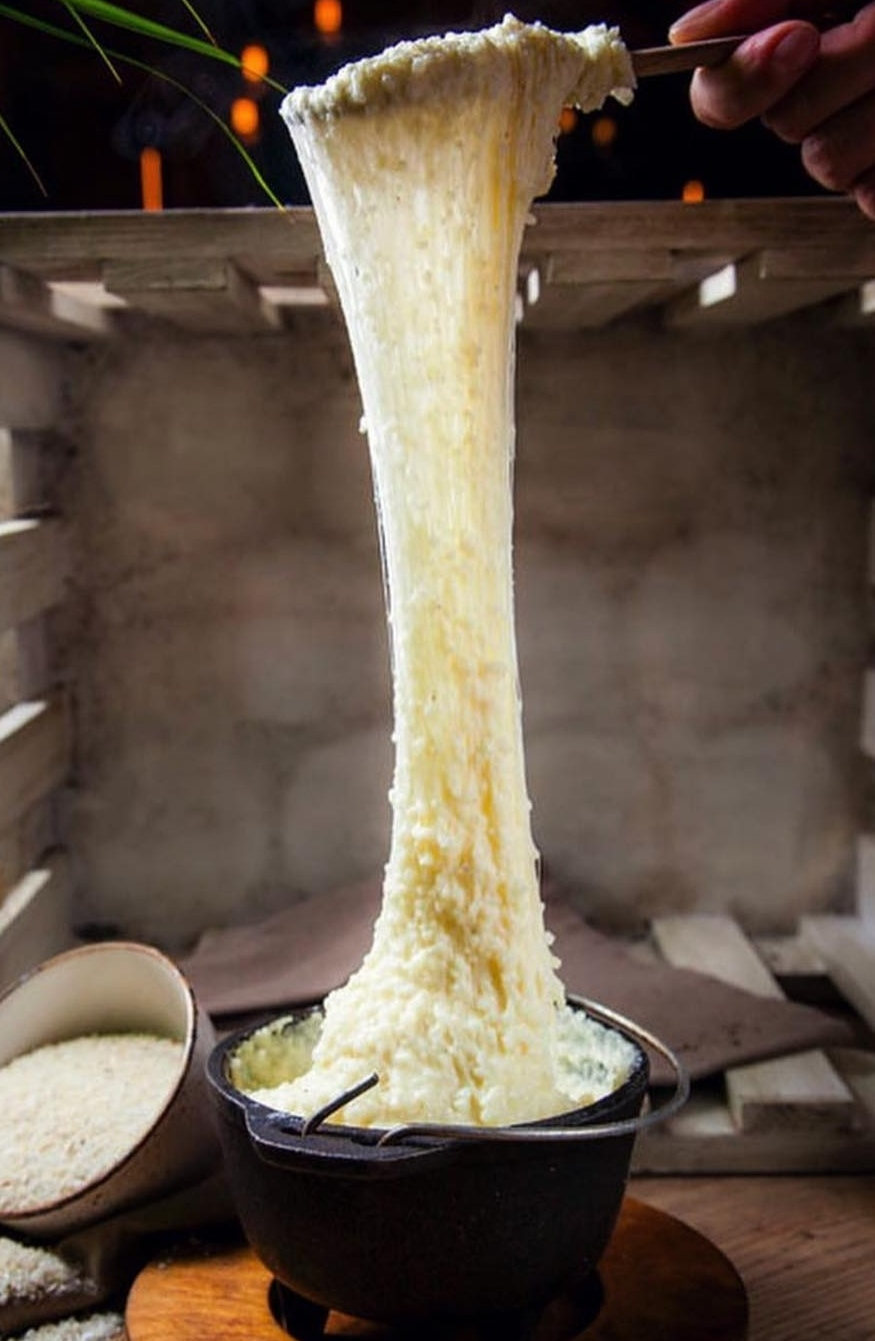
- Place of origin: Georgia

Elarji (Georgian: ელარჯი) is a traditional Georgian dish and a staple for the Samegrelo region of the country. It is prepared by kneading a large amount of sulguni cheese into a thick porridge (ghomi) made from cornmeal and flour. The dish is distinguished by its high elasticity and uniform structure.

Elarji is traditionally prepared for honored guests or for festive meals.

== Etymology ==
There are both linguistic and folk versions of the origin of the word “elarji”. According to the linguistic explanation, in Mingrelian language “elarji” means a mass that is mixed or mashed. According to Otar Kajaia's Megrelian-Georgian dictionary, elarji is defined as “cheese-mixed (cooked-mashed) ghomi”.

== History ==
The history of elarji is closely linked to the spread of corn cultivation in western Georgia. Until the 17th century, before corn was introduced to Georgia, the population used fescue (Setaria italica), which was later replaced by corn.

According to ethnographic data, elarji was originally a food for shepherds, as they in the Samegrelo's mountains carried a scythe with them and made cheese on the spot. In cold weather, a hot and caloric dish was the best source of energy.

== See also ==
- Sulguni
