= Mchadi =

Georgian bread

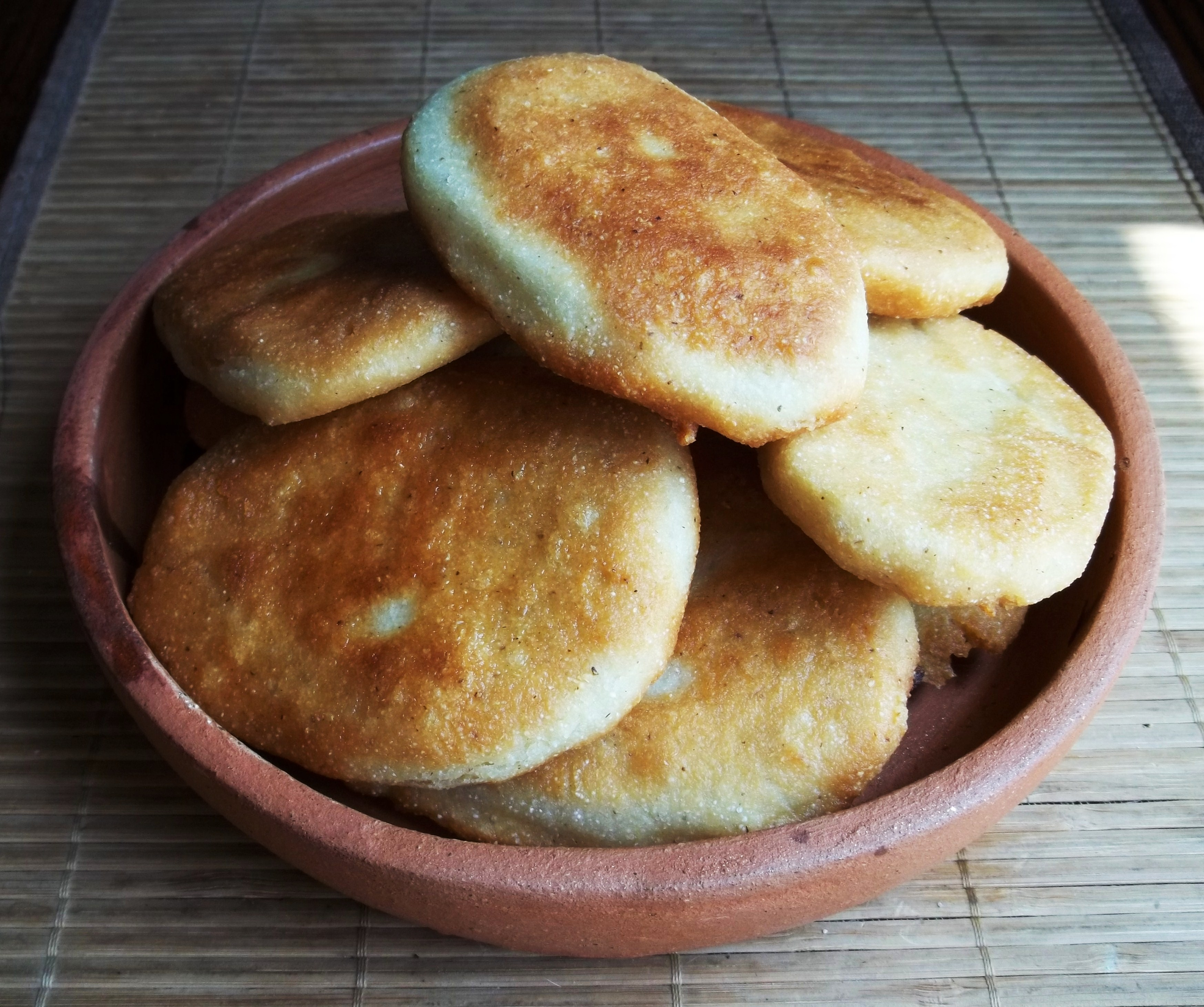
- Place of origin: Georgia

Mchadi (Georgian: მჭადი) is a traditional Georgian cornbread traditionally eaten with lobio and/or cheese. It is common in Imereti. It is made by combining cornmeal and water into a patty and then frying it.

A variation of this dish, chvishtari, is stuffed with cheese.

The name comes from the Georgian word for millet. In the past millet was an important cereal crop in Georgia. With the introduction of corn, millet lost its dominance, but the name of the flatbread stuck.
