= George Landis Arboretum =

Public garden near Esperance, New York

Coordinates: 42°47′05″N 74°16′13″W

The George Landis Arboretum is a public garden comprising hundreds of acres of which 40 are devoted to noteworthy collections and gardens overlooking the Schoharie Valley near Esperance, New York, United States. The physical address is 174 Lape Road. Forty acres of the Arboretum are developed with plantings of trees, shrubs, and herbaceous perennials from around the world, including approximately 2,000 labeled specimens. The remainder of the property consists of natural areas, woodlands, wetlands, more than 8 miles of trails, and open fields. Among the Arboretum's horticultural features are a labeled collection of nearly all the trees, shrubs and vines native to New York State, as well as collections of notable trees, flowering ornamental trees and shrubs, tough trees for tough sites, conifers, and oaks. Two old growth forests and additional natural areas representing various stages of succession await visitors The Van Loveland Perennial Garden at the old farmhouse is a seasonal favorite. Collection signage includes QR codes directed toward audio descriptions.

Educational programs relating to the trees, other plants and animals, and the arts are provided during the months of March through November. The Arboretum is home to the unique Landis Perennial Forest 5K Walk/Run in later summer each year. The Arboretum is open free to the public (donations appreciated!), from dawn to dusk every day of the year. The Meeting House hosts wedding and meetings, as well as musical performances.

== History ==
In 1903 Herman Franklin Lape purchased Oak Nose Farm, named for a white oak on a promontory overlooking the Schoharie Valley. He, his wife Emma (née Happe), and their son Frederick began the arduous life of farming on the 95 acres. They lived there until 1913, when the family moved to Esperance so that Fred could attend high school, first in Altamont, then in Cobleskill. In 1917, Fred continued his education at Cornell University. His mother and father moved back on the hill, but to the old Silvernail farm, located near Oak Nose Farm. After earning a degree in English, Fred taught first at Cornell, then at Stanford University in California.

In 1928, Herman Lape, now 62, became ill and could not continue farming. He and his wife moved back to Esperance for the remainder of Herman's days. Fred returned from California and moved onto the old farm, which had become decrepit. Having sold an article to Collier's, he decided to try to make a living as a writer. Although he wrote several articles and even a novel, sales were slow during the Depression. He worked the farm and did odd jobs, such as playing piano for area establishments. In 1932, he began a local poetry magazine, Trails, which featured his poetry as well as the work of many area writers, including W. W. Christman. Fred was interested in all artistic expression and encouraged visits from people involved in theater, music, sculpture, and other artistic endeavors.

Near the end of the 1930s, it became clear that more income was needed. In 1937, he became a part-time English professor at Rensselaer Polytechnic Institute in Troy, NY. There he became good friends with George Edwin Landis, a professor of economics. In 1948, George purchased a house in Troy and wanted to landscape it with unusual trees and shrubs, so he asked Fred for assistance. Many plants selected were planted on Fred's farm as well as at George's home. In December 1950, George Landis died unexpectedly, leaving the bulk of his estate to Fred. Using this legacy, Fred decided to continue the vision of an arboretum, naming it for the "friend who had made it all possible both in life and in death." With help from taxonomists and botanists, Fred learned by his own successes and mistakes. His expertise grew until he became known world-wide, participating in seed exchanges with other arboreta and botanic gardens across the globe.

In the late 1950s, another man important to the Arboretum began visiting. His name was Levan Loveland, but preferred to be called Van. He was a bank manager from NYC and an avid flower gardener. He moved to the farm after his retirement, and he planted beautiful flower gardens near the farmhouse. Under his guidance, the Arboretum became a corporation in 1966 and achieved IRS non-profit status in 1967. As the men aged, it became harder to maintain the gardens and grounds. Van died in 1977. While some projects such as the library (1982) were completed, the general condition of the Arboretum declined. Fred died in 1985 while wintering in Mexico. After Fred's death, improvements began under the direction of President Elizabeth Corning. In 1987, Pamela Rowling was hired as horticulturist and director, continuing the Arboretum's goals of expansion, protection, and education. In the years 2000 to 2005, new lands were donated and purchased, increasing the acreage to 548. With the assistance of our current director, Fred Breglia, and hundreds of dedicated volunteers, the Arboretum is realizing its full potential as a "tree museum," scenic park, and education center.

== Collection ==
A unique feature of the Landis Arboretum is the Ed Miller Native Plant Trail. Along the half mile Willow Plant trail, Ed and his family and friends have created a collection of woody plants, all native to New York state. The plants are grouped by families so that related species can be easily compared. Some plants with specialized needs are also planted in their favorite environment. There is a dry open location, an under-story location and a place set aside for wetland plants. Altogether the trail includes most of New York's native woody plants, including the recently added a fern area which represents ferns native to the region.

The collection also includes a bog garden with most of plants of a northern peat bog. This garden is located at the beginning of the woodland trail and includes both woody and herbaceous plants nestled in a bed of sphagnum moss floating on a raft. Many native plants are labeled along the woodland trail. The Arboretum is developing a comprehensive native flora interpretive signage program including QR codes linked to audio descriptions that will greatly add to the enjoyment and understanding of these areas. The Native Plant Trail has already been marked with QR codes; walkers can use their smart phones to listen to these audio clips for a guided tour. For fun, a xylophone is part of one of the bridges connecting trail elements - visitors are invited to try their hands at creating bridge music.

Additional Landis collections include: beeches, Buckleya distichophylla, clematis, crab apples, firs, lilacs, oaks (14 species), pines, rhododendrons and azaleas, spruce, and dwarf conifers. The fir (Abies) collection is one of the most complete groupings of mature firs in the east, with sixteen species. Lape's propagation gave rise to a number of widely known cultivars including Rhododendron × 'Esperance', Syringa vulgaris 'Schoharie' (lilac), Chaenomeles speciosa 'George Landis' (quince), and some unnamed cultivars of Malus pumila var. niedzwetzkyana (crabapples). The 5000 sheet Baim Herbarium joined the Arboretum in 1990, with collections from the Adirondacks, northeastern and southeastern American states, and the South Pacific. It includes an almost complete flora of Schenectady County.

A detailed list of the species in its collections includes:

- Abies alba, A. amabilis, A. balsamea, A. cephalonica, A. concolor, A. fraseri, A. grandis, A. holophylla, A. homolepis, A. lasiocarpa, A. nephrolepis, A. nordmanniana, A. pinsapo, A. procera, A. recurvata, A. sachalinensis
- Acer campestre, A. cappadocicum, A. carpinifolium, A. diabolicum, A. ginnala, A. griseum, A. negundo, A. nikoense, A. palmatum, A. pensylvanicum, A. platanoides, A. rubrum, A. saccharinum, A. saccharum, A. spicatum, A. tataricum, A. truncatum
- Actinidia arguta
- Aesculus glabra, A. hippocastanum, A. parviflora, A. pavia
- Akebia quinata
- Alnus hirsuta
- Amelanchier canadensis, A. laevis
- Amorpha fruticosa
- Ampelopsis brevipedunculata
- Aralia spinosa
- Arctostaphylos uva-ursi
- Aronia arbutifolia, A. melanocarpa
- Asimina triloba
- Berberis amurensis, B. koreana, B. sieboldii, B. thunbergii
- Betula alleghaniensis, B. papyrifera, B. pendula, B. populifolia
- Buckleya distichophylla
- Buxus microphylla, B. sempervirens
- Campsis radicans
- Caragana sp
- Carpinus betulus, C. caroliniana
- Carya ovata
- Caryopteris × clandonesis
- Castanea crenata, C. dentata
- Catalpa ovata, C. speciosa
- Celastrus orbiculatus
- Celtis occidentalis
- Cephalanthus occidentalis
- Cercidiphyllum japonicum
- Cercis canadensis, C. chinensis
- Chaenomeles speciosa
- Chamaecyparis obtusa, C. pisifera, C. thyoides
- Chamaedaphne calyculata
- Chionanthus virginicus
- Cladrastis kentuckea
- Clematis sp.
- Clethra alnifolia
- Cornus alternifolia, C. amomum, C. florida, C. kousa, C. mas, C. racemosa, C. rugosa, C. sericea
- Corylus americana, C. colurna
- Cotinus coggygria
- Cotoneaster adpressus, C. apiculatus, C. horizontalis, C. wardii
- Crataegus chrysocarpa, C. crus-galli, C. laevigata, C. mollis, C. phaenopyrum, C. viridis
- Daphne cneorum, D. mezereum
- Deutzia gracilis, D. scabra
- Diospyros virginiana
- Enkianthus campanulatus
- Euonymus alatus, E. atropurpurea, E. europaea, E. kiautschovicus, E. oxyphylla, E. yedoensis
- Exochorda racemosa
- Fagus grandifolia, F. sylvatica
- Forsythia × intermedia, F. ovata
- Fothergilla major
- Fraxinus americana, F. excelsior, F. nigra, F. ornus, F. oxycarpa, F. pennsylvanica, F. quadrangulata, F. sieboldiana
- Genista tinctoria
- Ginkgo biloba
- Gleditsia triacanthos
- Gymnocladus dioicus
- Halesia carolina
- Hamamelis mollis, H. virginiana
- Hibiscus syriacus
- Hippophae rhamnoides
- Hydrangea anomala, H. arborescens, H. paniculata, H. petiolaris, H. quercifolia
- Ilex crenata, I. glabra, I. macropoda, I. opaca, I. verticillata, I. yunnanensis
- Juglans cinerea, J. nigra, J. sieboldiana
- Juniperus chinensis, J. communis, J. procumbens, J. rigida, J. squamata, J. virginiana
- Kalmia latifolia
- Kerria japonica
- Koelreuteria paniculata
- Larix decidua, L. gmelini, L. kaempferi, L. laricina, L. sibirica
- Lespedeza cyrtobotrya, L. thunbergii
- Leucothoe fontanesiana
- Ligustrum amurense
- Lindera benzoin
- Liquidambar styraciflua
- Liriodendron tulipifera
- Lonicera dioica, L. korolkowii, L. quinquelocularis, L. ramosissima, L. serotina, L. syringantha
- Lyonia ligustrina
- Maackia amurensis
- Maclura pomifera
- Magnolia kobus, M. stellata, M. virginiana
- Mahonia aquifolium
- Malus baccata, M. floribunda, M. hupehensis, M. ioensis, M. pumila, M. sargentii, M. spectabilis, M. toringoides
- Menispermum canadense
- Metasequoia glyptostroboides
- Morus alba
- Myrica gale
- Neillia sinensis
- Nemopanthus mucronatus
- Nyssa sylvatica
- Orixa japonica
- Oxydendrum arboreum
- Parrotia persica
- Paxistima canbyi
- Penstemon davidsonii menziesii
- Periploca graeca
- Phellodendron amurense
- Philadelphus sp
- Photinia villosa
- Physocarpus opulifolius
- Picea abies, P. alcoquiana, P. engelmannii, P. glauca, P jezoensis, P. mariana, P. obovata, P. omorika, P. orientalis, P. pungens, P. rubens, P. schrenkiana, P. sitchensis, P. torano, P. wilsonii
- Pieris japonica
- Pinus armandii, P. attenuata, P. banksiana, P. cembra, P. contorta, P. densiflora, P. echinata, P. flexilis, P. heldreichii, P. jeffreyi, P. koraiensis, P. mugo, P. nigra, P. parviflora, P. ponderosa, P. resinosa, P. rigida, P. strobus, P. sylvestris, P. tabuliformis, P. virginiana
- Platanus occidentalis
- Platycladus orientalis
- Populus alba, P. deltoides, P. grandidentata, P. nigra, P. tremuloides
- Potentilla fruticosa, P. villosa
- Prunus americana, P. fruticosa, P. glandulosa, P. incisa, P. mahaleb, P. sargentii, P. serotina, P. spinosa, P. subhirtella, P. virginiana
- Pseudolarix amabilis
- Pseudotsuga menziesii
- Ptelea trifoliata
- Pyracantha coccinea
- Pyrus calleryana, P. communis, P. salicifolia
- Quercus acutissima, Q. alba, Q. bicolor, Q. coccinea, Q. imbricaria, Q. macrocarpa, Q. marilandica, Q. mongolica, Q. palustris, Q. petraea, Q. prinoides, Q. prinus, Q. robur, Q. rubra, Q. shumardii, Q. stellata, Q. velutina
- Rhamnus cathartica, R. frangula, R. japonica
- Rhododendron arborescens, R. bakeri, R. brachycarpum, R. brachycarpum, R. calendulaceum, R. canadense, R. carolinianum, R. catawbiense, R. dauricum, R. fauriei, R. fortunei, R. japonicum, R. kaempferi, R. keiskei, R. luteum, R. metternichii, R. mucronalatum, R. mucronulatum, R. schlippenbachii, R smirnowii, sutchuenense, R. vaseyi, R. viscosum, R. yakusimanum, R. yedoense
- Rhus typhina
- Ribes odoratum
- Rosa blanda, R. palustris, R. rubrifolia
- Rubus odoratus
- Salix alba, S. babylonica, S. caprea, S. helvetica, S. matsudana, S. melanostachys, S. purpurea
- Sassafras albidum
- Sciadopitys verticillata
- Securinega suffruticosa
- Sorbus alnifolia, S. americana, S. aria, S. aucuparia, S. discolor, S. matsumurana, S. scopulina
- Spiraea bullata, S. japonica, S. thunbergii
- Staphylea bumalda, S. colchica, S. trifolia
- Stuartia pseudocamellia, S. sinensis
- Styrax japonica
- Symplocos paniculata
- Syringa josikaea, S. komarowi, S. oblata, S. patula, S. pekinensis, S. reflexa, S. reticulata, S. sweginzowii, S. villosa, S. vulgaris, S. wolfi, S. yunnanensis
- Tamarix parviflora
- Taxodium distichum
- Taxus baccata, T. cuspidata
- Thuja koraiensis, T. occidentalis, T. plicata
- Tilia americana, T. cordata
- Tsuga canadensis, T. caroliniana
- Ulmus americana, U. fulva, U. parvifolia, U. pumila
- Vaccinium corymbosum
- Vancouveria hexandra
- Viburnum bitchiuense, V. cassinoides, V. dentatum, V. dilatatum, V. farreri, V. fragrans, V. hupehense, V. lantana, V. lentago, V. opulus, V. plicatum, V. rhytidophyllum, V. sargentii, V. trilobum
- Weigela sp.
- Xanthocyparis nootkatensis
- Zelkova serrata

== See also ==
- List of botanical gardens in the United States
- North American Plant Collections Consortium
