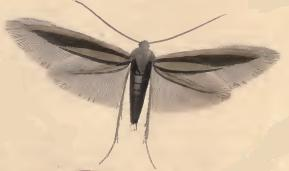

Scientific classification
- Kingdom: Animalia
- Phylum: Arthropoda
- Class: Insecta
- Order: Lepidoptera
- Family: Coleophoridae
- Genus: Coleophora
- Species: C. violacea

Binomial name
- Coleophora violacea (Ström, 1783)

Synonyms
- Phalaena violacea Strom, 1783; Coleophora albicornuella Bradley, 1956; Coleophora hornigi Toll, 1952

= Coleophora violacea =

Species of moth

Coleophora violacea is a moth of the family Coleophoridae. It is found from Fennoscandia to the Pyrenees, Italy and Hungary and from Great Britain to Russia.

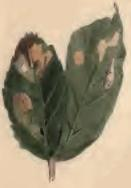
Mined leaves of Prunus spinosa with a larva-case attached

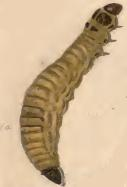
Larva

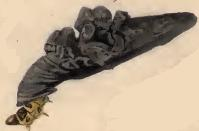
Larval case

== Description ==
The wingspan is 9–11 mm (0.35–0.43 in). Adults are on wing from late May to June in western Europe.

The larvae feed on Agrimonia, Alnus, Betula, Carpinus betulus, Castanea sativa, Cornus, Corylus avellana, Crataegus, Cydonia oblonga, Filipendula ulmaria, Fragaria vesca, Humulus lupulus, Lonicera, Lythrum, Malus sylvestris, Mespilus germanica, Potentilla, Prunus spinosa, Pyrus communis, Rhamnus catharticus, Ribes, Rosa, Rubus, Sanguisorba, Sorbus, Staphylea pinnata, Symphoricarpos albus, Tilia, Ulmus and Viburnum species. Full-grown larvae can be found in October.
