= Topoľové hony =

Nature reserve in Slovakia

Coordinates: 48.079118°N 17.203408°E

- IUCN category Ia (strict nature reserve)
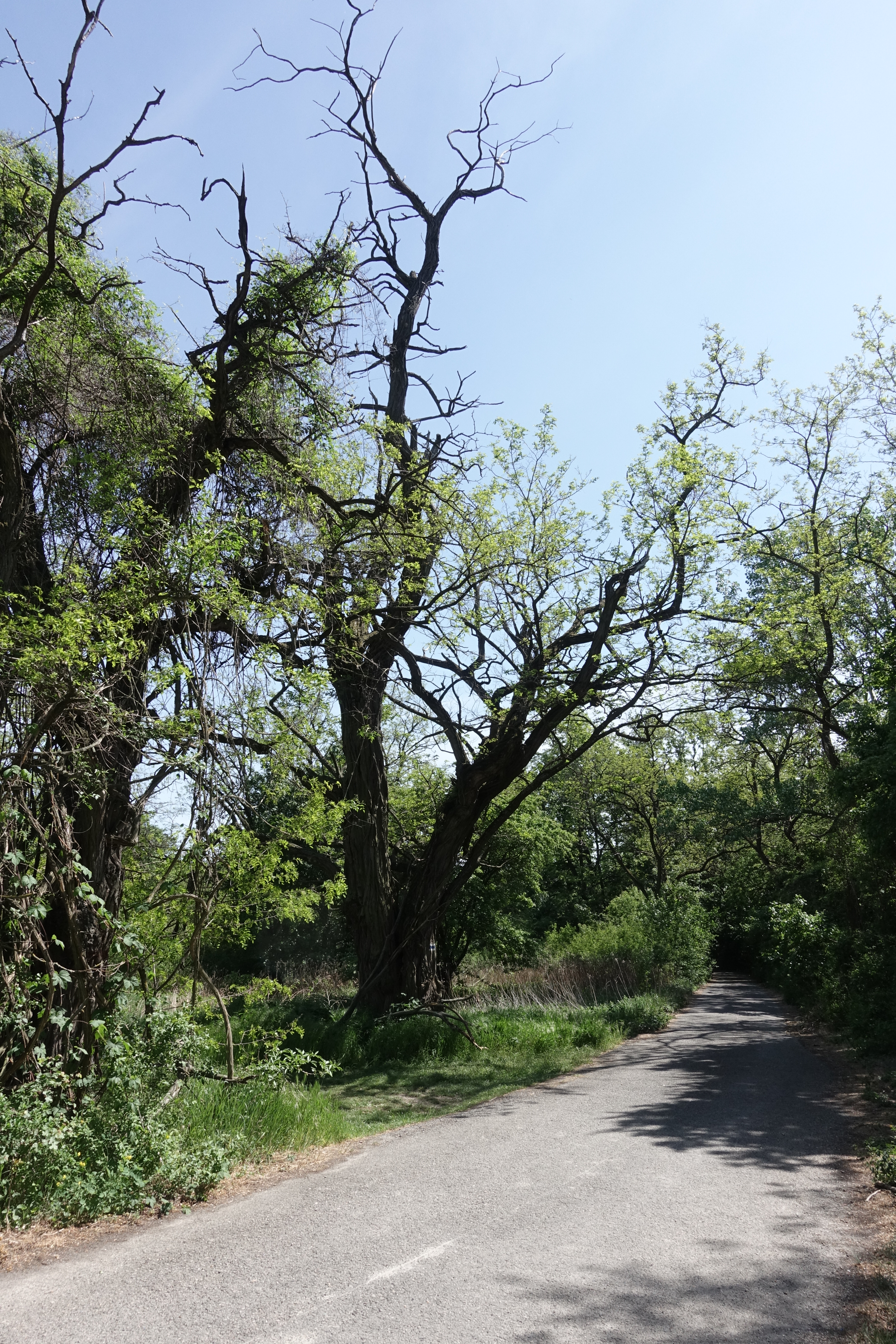
- Interactive map of Topoľové hony
- Area: 0.6006 km^{2} (0.2319 sq mi)
- Established: 1988
- Governing body: ŠOP - S-CHKO Dunajské luhy

Topoľové hony is a nature reserve in the Podunajské Biskupice district of Bratislava, Slovakia. The nature reserve covers an area of 60.06 ha (148.4 acres) on the left shore of the Danube. It has a protection level of 5 under the Slovak nature protection system. The nature reserve is part of the Dunajské luhy Protected Landscape Area.

== Description ==
The area was put under protection as a measure to preserve xerophilous pannonic oak forests and plant communities including Staphylea pinnata.
