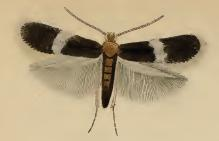

Scientific classification
- Kingdom: Animalia
- Phylum: Arthropoda
- Class: Insecta
- Order: Lepidoptera
- Family: Nepticulidae
- Genus: Ectoedemia
- Species: E. atricollis

Binomial name
- Ectoedemia atricollis (Stainton, 1857)

Synonyms
- List: Nepticula atricollis Stainton, 1857; Nepticula aterrima Wocke, 1865; Nepticula atricolella Doubleday, 1859; Nepticula staphyleae Zimmermann, 1944

= Ectoedemia atricollis =

Species of moth

Ectoedemia atricollis is a moth of the family Nepticulidae found in Asia and Europe. It was described by the English entomologist Henry Tibbats Stainton in 1857.

== Description ==
The wingspan is 5–6 mm. Adults are on wing in June.Edward Meyrick describes it thus − Head ferruginous-orange, collar dark brown. Antennal eyecaps white. Forewings black a shining silvery sometimes interrupted fascia slightly beyond middle; outer half of cilia beyond a black line white. Hindwings grey. Larvae pale greenish; head and plate of 2 blackish.

The larvae feed on Midland hawthorn (Crataegus laevigata), hawthorn (Crataegus monogyna), apple (Malus domestica), European crab apple (Malus sylvestris), medlar (Mespilus germanica), common pear (Pyrus communis), wild cherry (Prunus avium), cherry plum (Prunus cerasifera), damson (Prunus insititia), mahaleb cherry (Prunus mahaleb) and European bladdernut (Staphylea pinnata). They mine the leaves of their host plant.

== Distribution ==
It is found from Scandinavia to the Pyrenees, Italy, and Romania and from Ireland to Ukraine and the Volga and Ural regions of Russia. It has also been recorded from Tajikistan, where it is probably an introduced species.

== Gallery ==
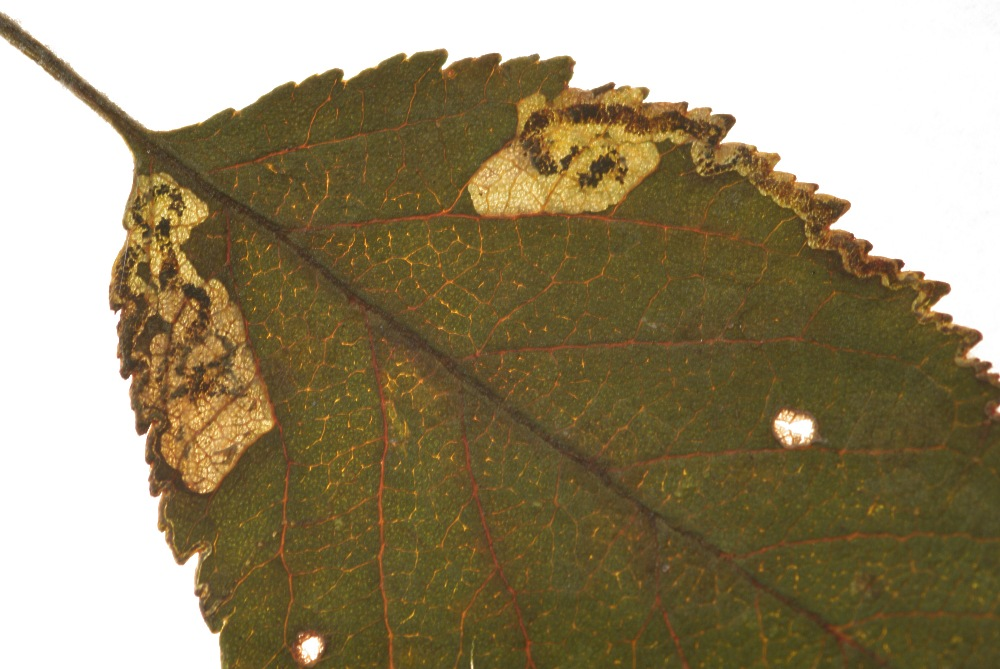
Mines on apple (Malus species)

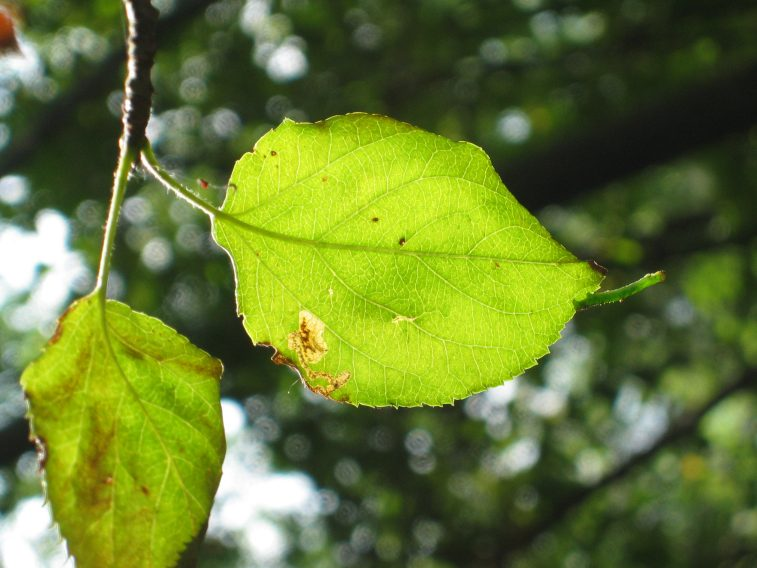
Mines on apple

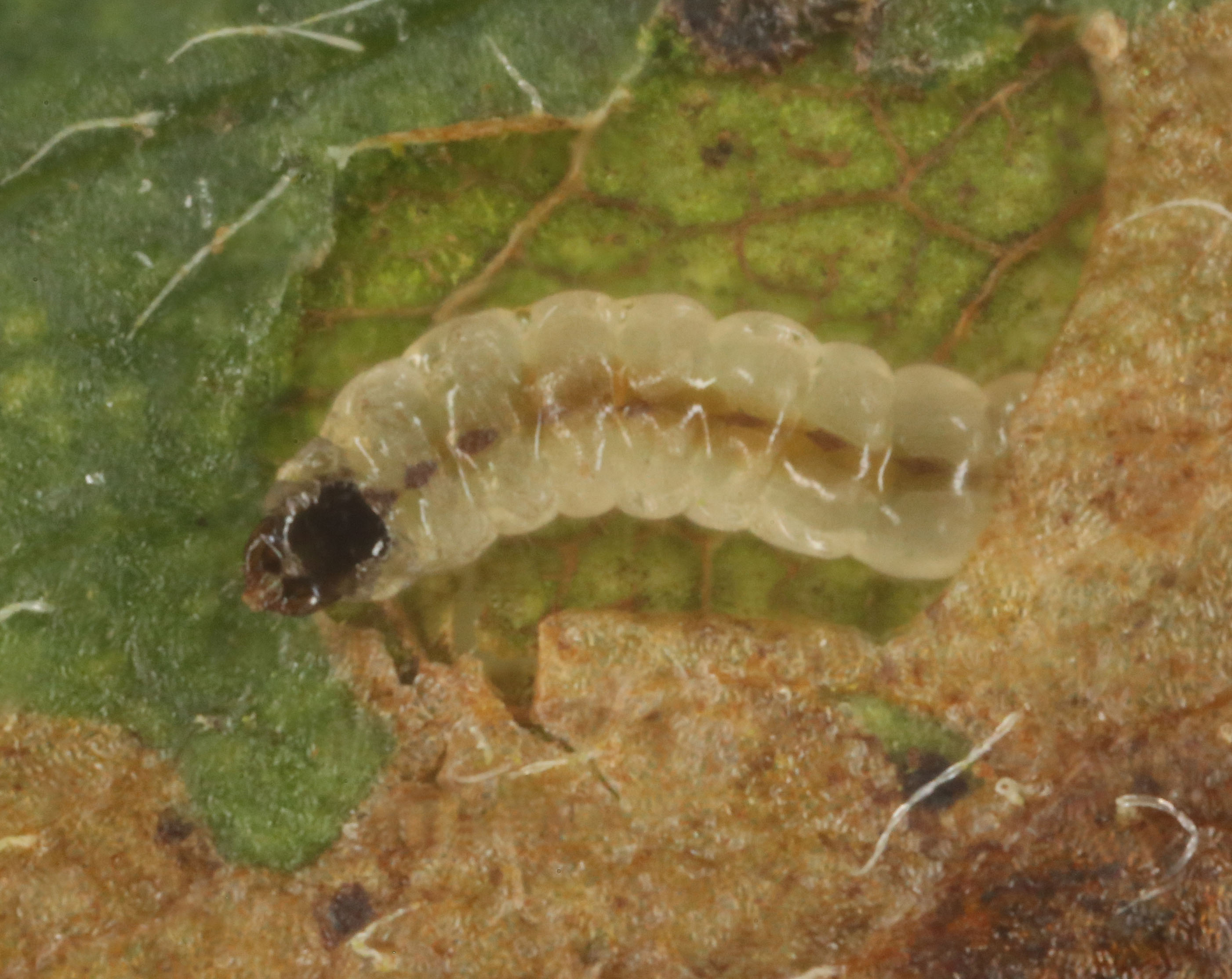
Larva

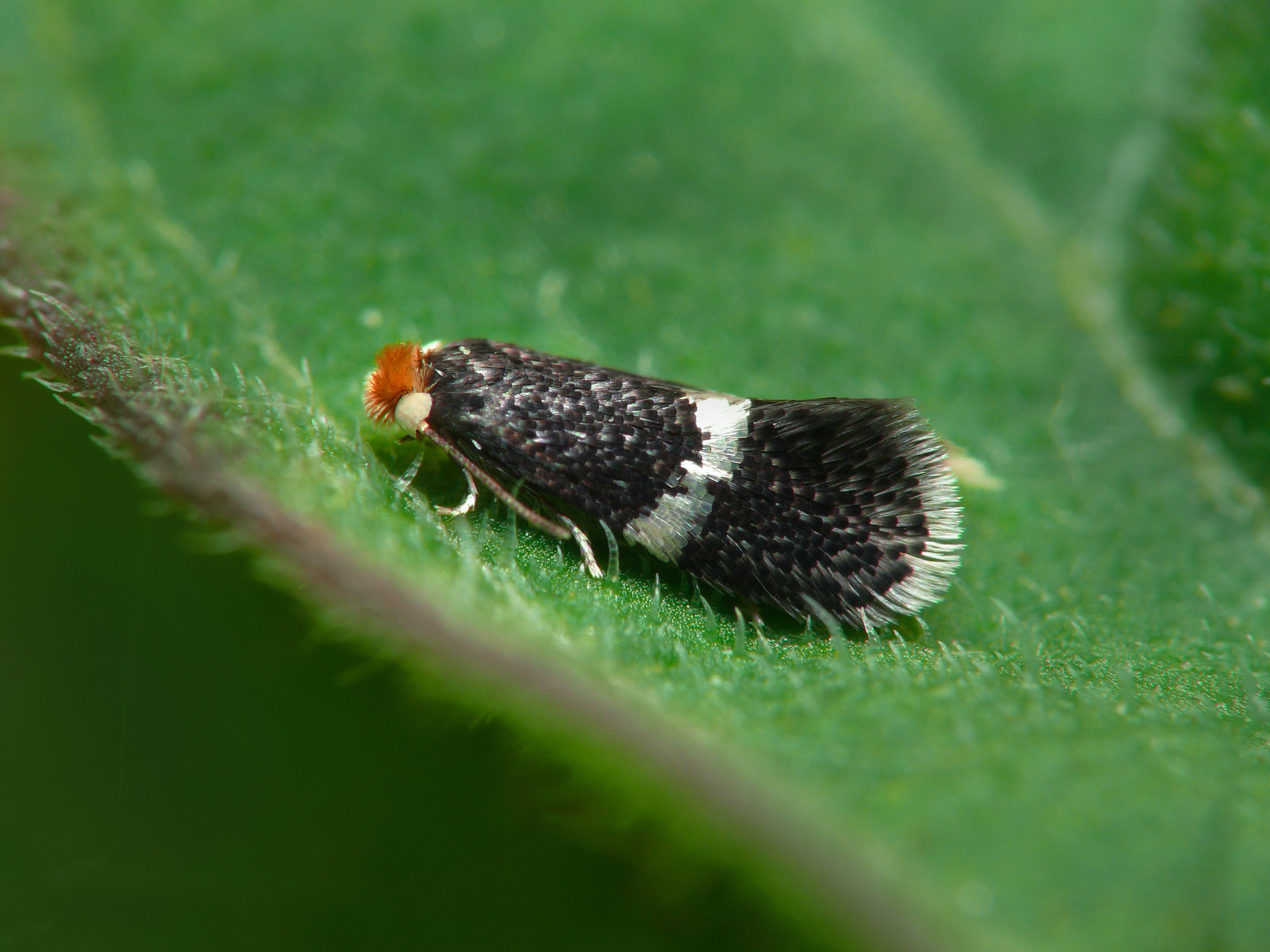
Imago

== Etymology ==
Originally named Nepticula atricollis by Henry Tibbats Stainton in 1857, from a type species found in England. Nepticula – from neptis, a granddaughter, potentially the smallest member of a family and referring to the very small size of the moths. The genus Ectoedemia was raised by the Danish-American entomologist August Busck in 1907. The name is from the Greek ektos – outside, and oidema – a tumour or swelling, from the larval feeding habits of the type species, Ectoedemia populella, which form globular galls on the petioles of various poplar species. The species name atricollis is from ater – black, and collum – the neck; referring to the larva's black prothoracic plate (see photograph above).
