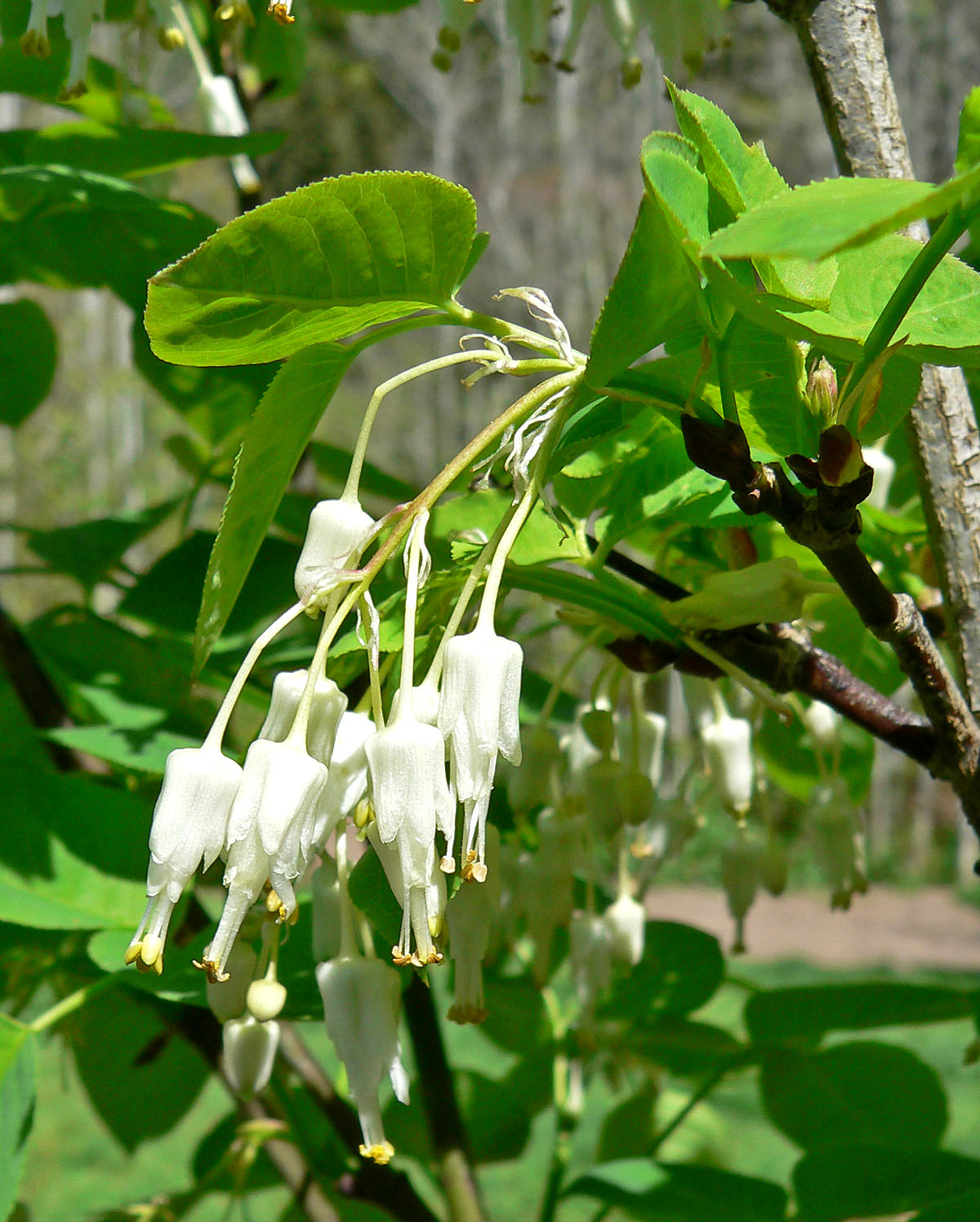

Scientific classification
- Kingdom: Plantae
- Clade: Tracheophytes
- Clade: Angiosperms
- Clade: Eudicots
- Clade: Rosids
- Order: Crossosomatales
- Family: Staphyleaceae
- Genus: Staphylea
- Species: S. bolanderi

Binomial name
- Staphylea bolanderi A.Gray

= Staphylea bolanderi =

Species of tree

Staphylea bolanderi, common name Sierra bladdernut, is an uncommon species of bladdernut endemic to California. It ranges from the southern Sierra Nevada to the southernmost slopes of the Cascade Range and the Klamath Mountains. It is a shrub or small tree growing 2–6 m tall. The deciduous leaves are each made up of three round or oval leaflets with toothed edges, each leaflet measuring up to 6 cm long. The inflorescence is a panicle of flowers drooping on long pedicels. Each flower has five white petals within five snow white sepals, and a cluster of five stamens protruding from the mouth. The fruit is an inflated, bladderlike capsule up to 5 cm long containing smooth brown seeds.

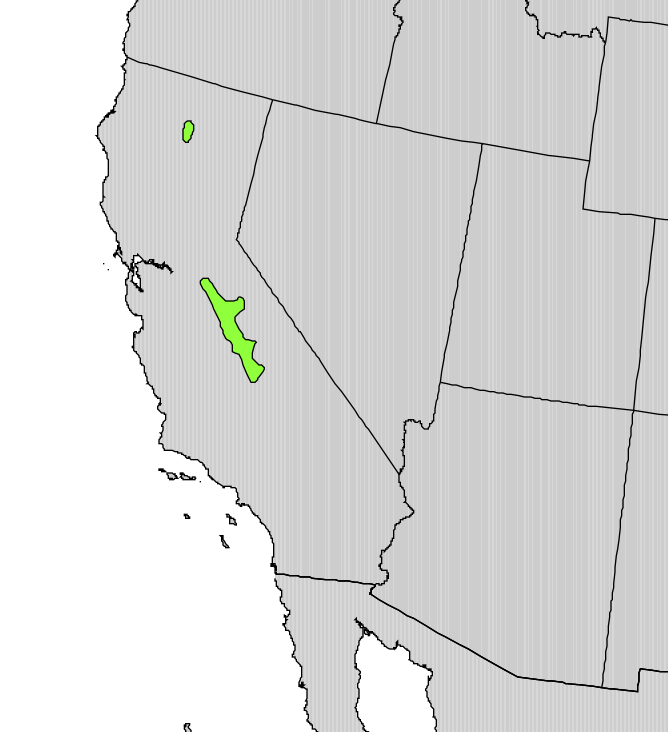
Natural range
