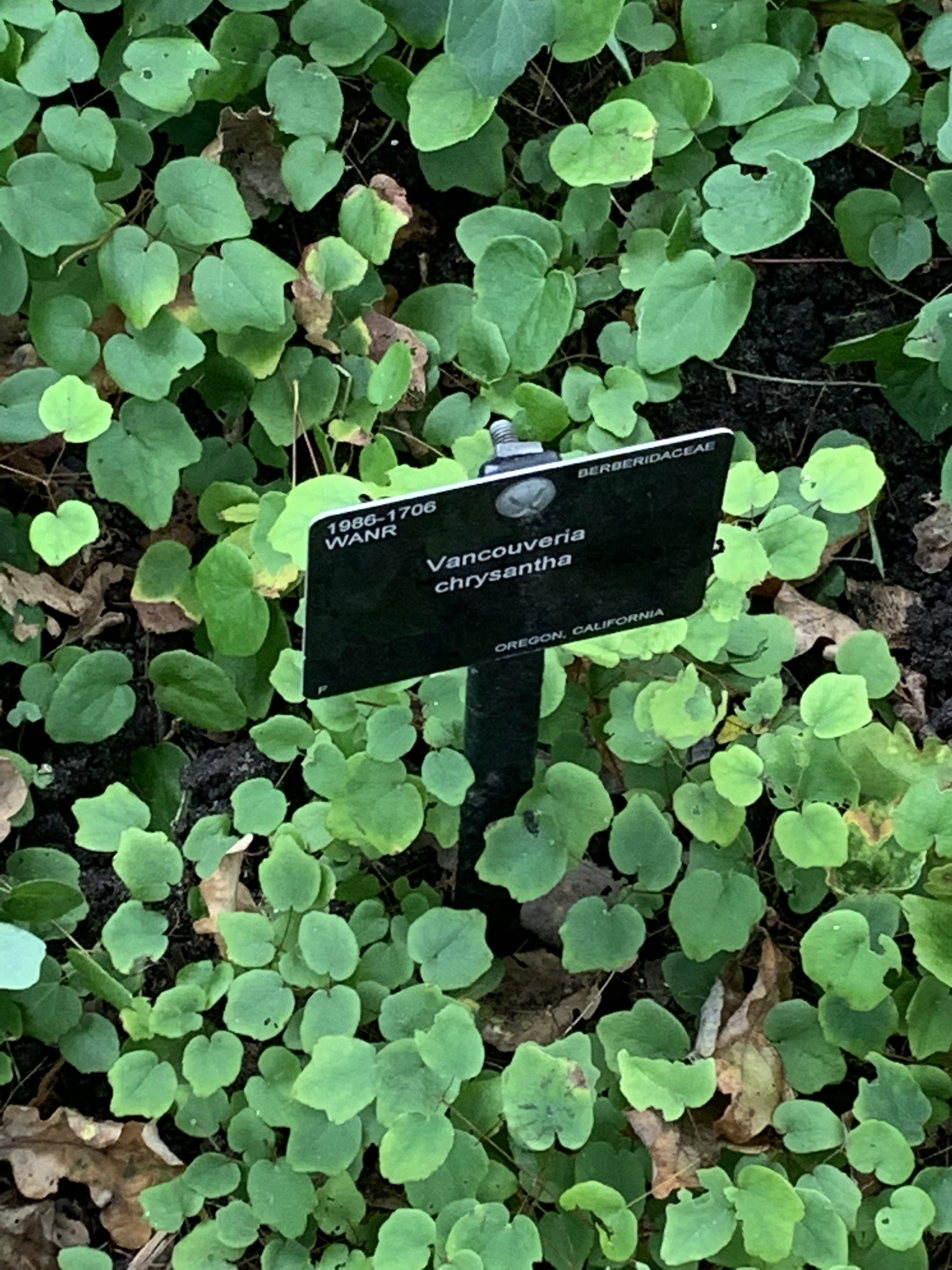

Scientific classification
- Kingdom: Plantae
- Clade: Tracheophytes
- Clade: Angiosperms
- Clade: Eudicots
- Order: Ranunculales
- Family: Berberidaceae
- Genus: Vancouveria
- Species: V. chrysantha

Binomial name
- Vancouveria chrysantha Greene

= Vancouveria chrysantha =

Species of flowering plant

Vancouveria chrysantha is a species of flowering plant in the barberry family known by the common names golden inside-out flower and Siskiyou inside-out flower.

== Description ==
Vancouveria chrysantha is a rhizomatous perennial herb with a short, mostly underground stem. It produces a patch of basal leaves which are each made up of round, shallowly lobed leaflets borne on long, reddish petioles.

The inflorescence appears in the spring to early summer. It is a raceme of flowers on a long, erect peduncle with hairy, glandular branches. Each drooping flower has six inner sepals which look like petals. They are bright yellow, up to a centimeter long, and reflexed back, or upwards, away from the flower center. Lying against the sepals are the smaller true petals, which are also bright yellow, curled, and hood-like. There are six stamens and a large glandular ovary.

== Distribution ==
The plant is native to northwestern California and southwestern Oregon.

It occurs in the Klamath Mountains below 1,500 metres (4,900 ft). It grows in dry mountain habitat in chaparral and forests, often on serpentine soils.
