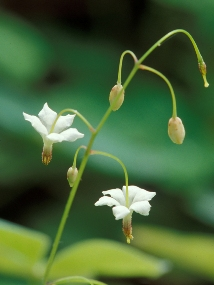

Scientific classification
- Kingdom: Plantae
- Clade: Tracheophytes
- Clade: Angiosperms
- Clade: Eudicots
- Order: Ranunculales
- Family: Berberidaceae
- Genus: Vancouveria
- Species: V. planipetala

Binomial name
- Vancouveria planipetala Calloni

= Vancouveria planipetala =

Species of flowering plant

Vancouveria planipetala is a species of flowering plant in the barberry family known by the common names redwood inside-out flower and redwood ivy.

== Distribution ==
The plant is native to northwestern California and southwestern Oregon, where it occurs in Klamath Mountains and northern California Coast Ranges.

It grows in forests, especially Coast redwood forests.

== Description ==
Vancouveria planipetala is a rhizomatous perennial herb with a short, mostly underground stem. It produces a patch of basal leaves which are each made up of round or heart-shaped leaflets borne on long, reddish petioles.

The inflorescence appears in May and June. It is a panicle of flowers on a long, erect peduncle. Each small, drooping flower has six inner sepals which look like petals. They are a few millimeters in length, white, and reflexed back, or upwards, away from the flower center. Lying against the sepals are the smaller true petals, which are white or purple-tinged and flat-tipped or notched. There are six stamens and a large glandular ovary.

The species is cultivated as an ornamental plant, for planting in native plant and wildlife gardens.
