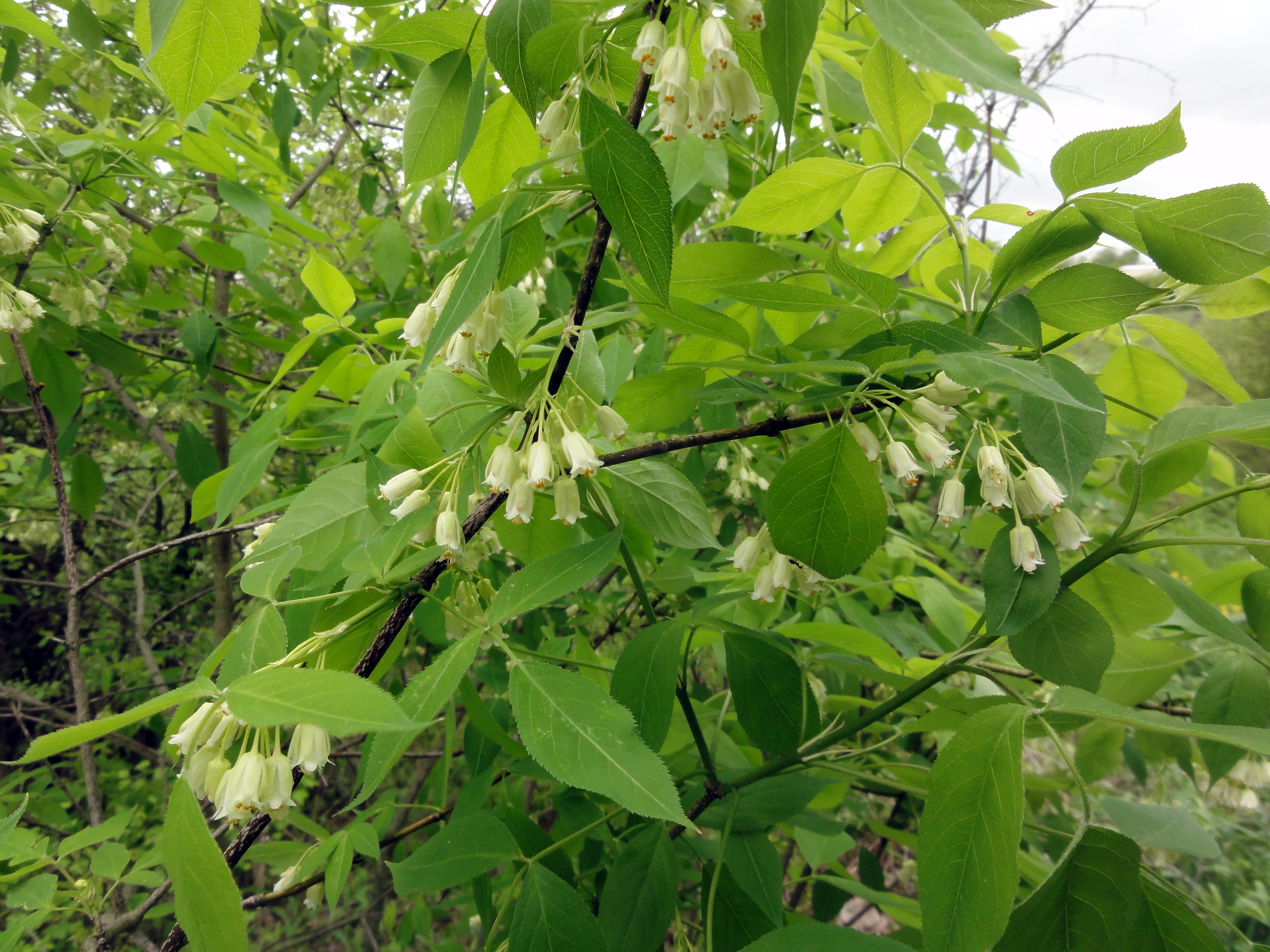

Conservation status
- Least Concern (IUCN 3.1)

Scientific classification
- Kingdom: Plantae
- Clade: Tracheophytes
- Clade: Angiosperms
- Clade: Eudicots
- Clade: Rosids
- Order: Crossosomatales
- Family: Staphyleaceae
- Genus: Staphylea
- Species: S. trifolia

Binomial name
- Staphylea trifolia L.
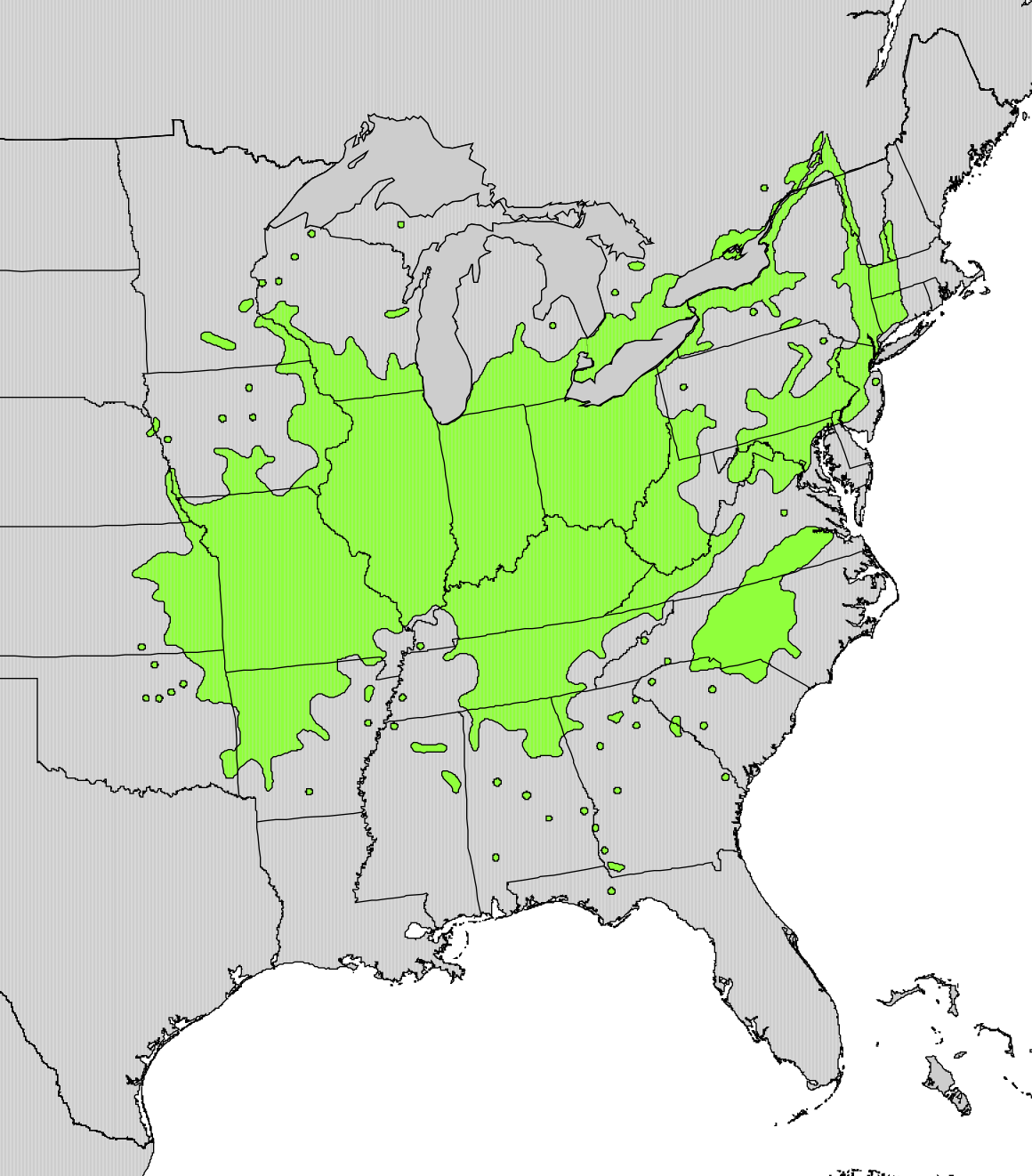

= Staphylea trifolia =

Species of flowering plant

Staphylea trifolia, the American bladdernut, is native to eastern North America, from southern Ontario and southwestern Quebec west to Nebraska and Arkansas, and south to Florida. It is sometimes used as an ornamental plant.

It is a medium-sized shrub growing to 3.5 m (11 ft) tall. Its growth rate is medium to fast. The leaves are opposite and divided into three leaflets, each leaflet 4.5–13 cm (2–5 in) long and 5 cm (2 in) broad, with a serrated margin. The leaves are bright green in the spring, turning dark green in the summer. S. trifolia produces pendant white flowers in spring, which mature into bladder-like, teardrop-shaped fruits that contain 1-3 brown popcorn-like seeds. Some sources consider these "nuts" to be edible.
