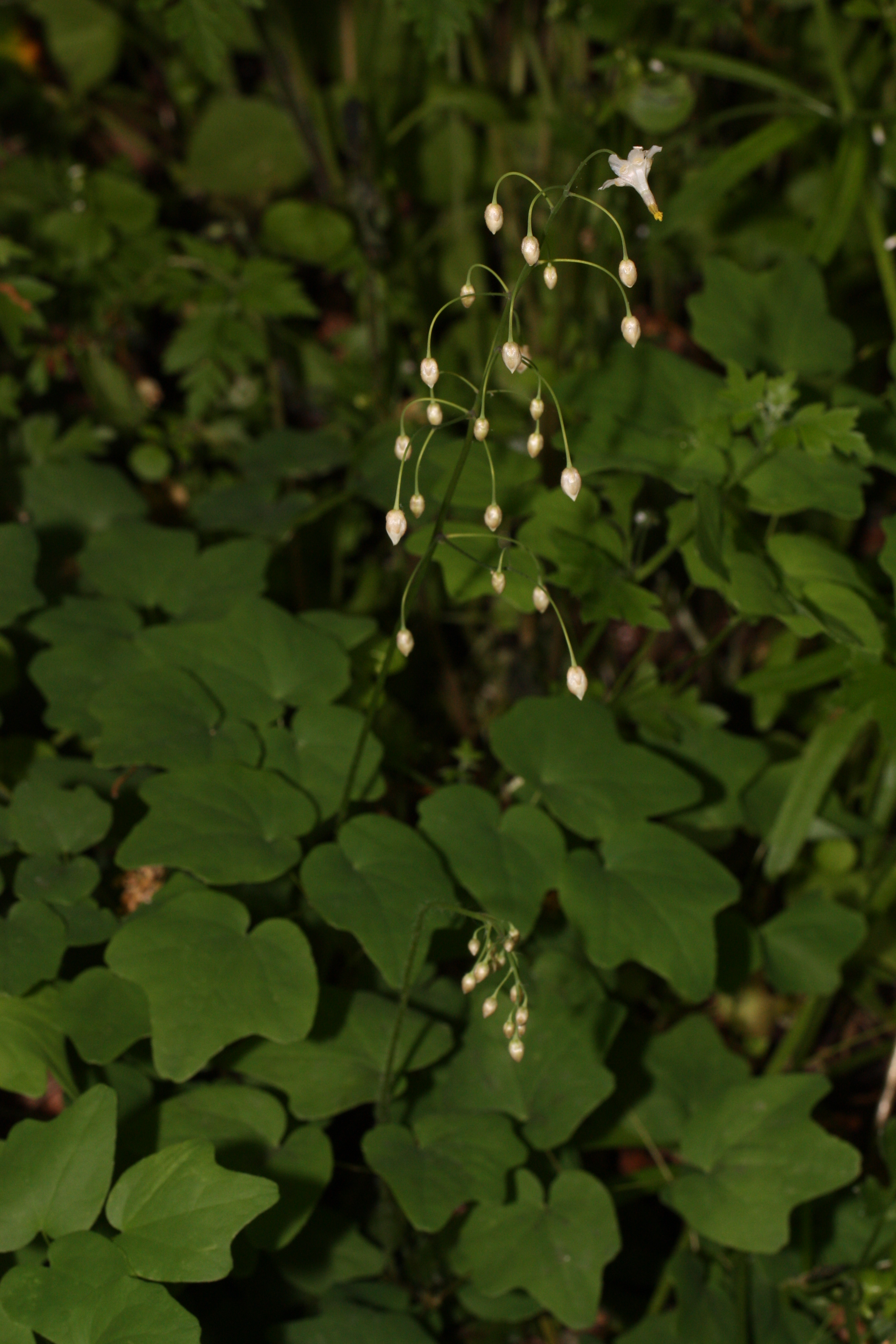
- Vancouveria hexandra

Scientific classification
- Kingdom: Plantae
- Clade: Tracheophytes
- Clade: Angiosperms
- Clade: Eudicots
- Order: Ranunculales
- Family: Berberidaceae
- Genus: Vancouveria; C.Morren & Decne.

= Vancouveria =

Inside-out flowers

Genus of flowering plants belonging to the barberry family

Vancouveria (/væn.kuːˈvɪəriə/) is a small group of plants belonging to the barberry family described as a genus in 1834. The three plants in this genus are known generally as inside-out flowers, and they are endemic to the West Coast of the United States. The genus was named after George Vancouver, English navigator and explorer.

Species

| Image | Name | Distribution |
|---|---|---|
| | Vancouveria chrysantha Greene – golden inside-out flower | California (Siskiyou + Del Norte Counties), Oregon (Curry + Josephine Counties) |
| | Vancouveria hexandra (Hook.) C.Morren & Decne. – white inside-out flower | northwestern California (from Napa to Siskiyou), western Oregon, southwestern Washington |
| | Vancouveria planipetala Calloni – redwood inside-out flower | California as far south as Monterey County, southwestern Oregon |
