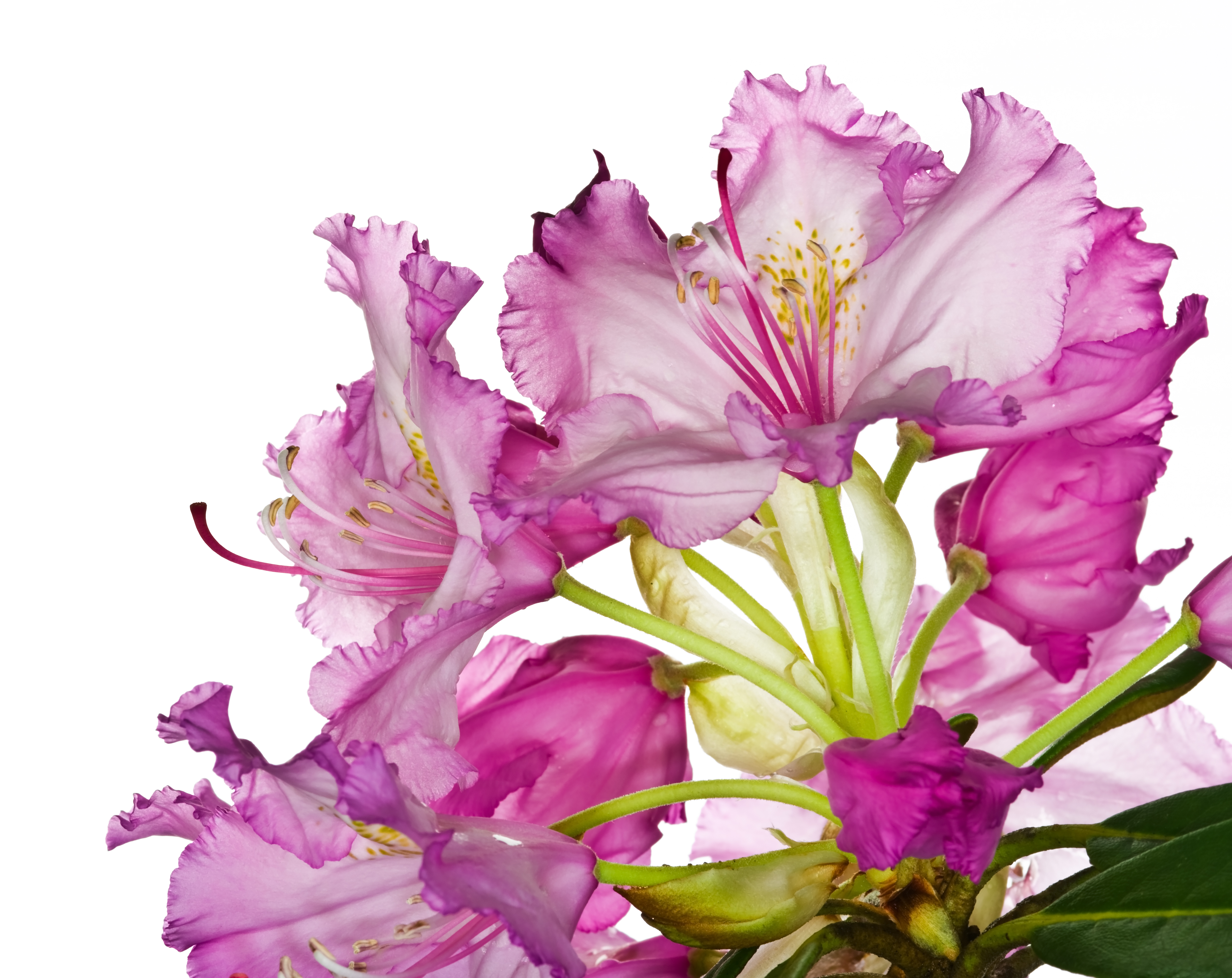
- Close-up of flowers
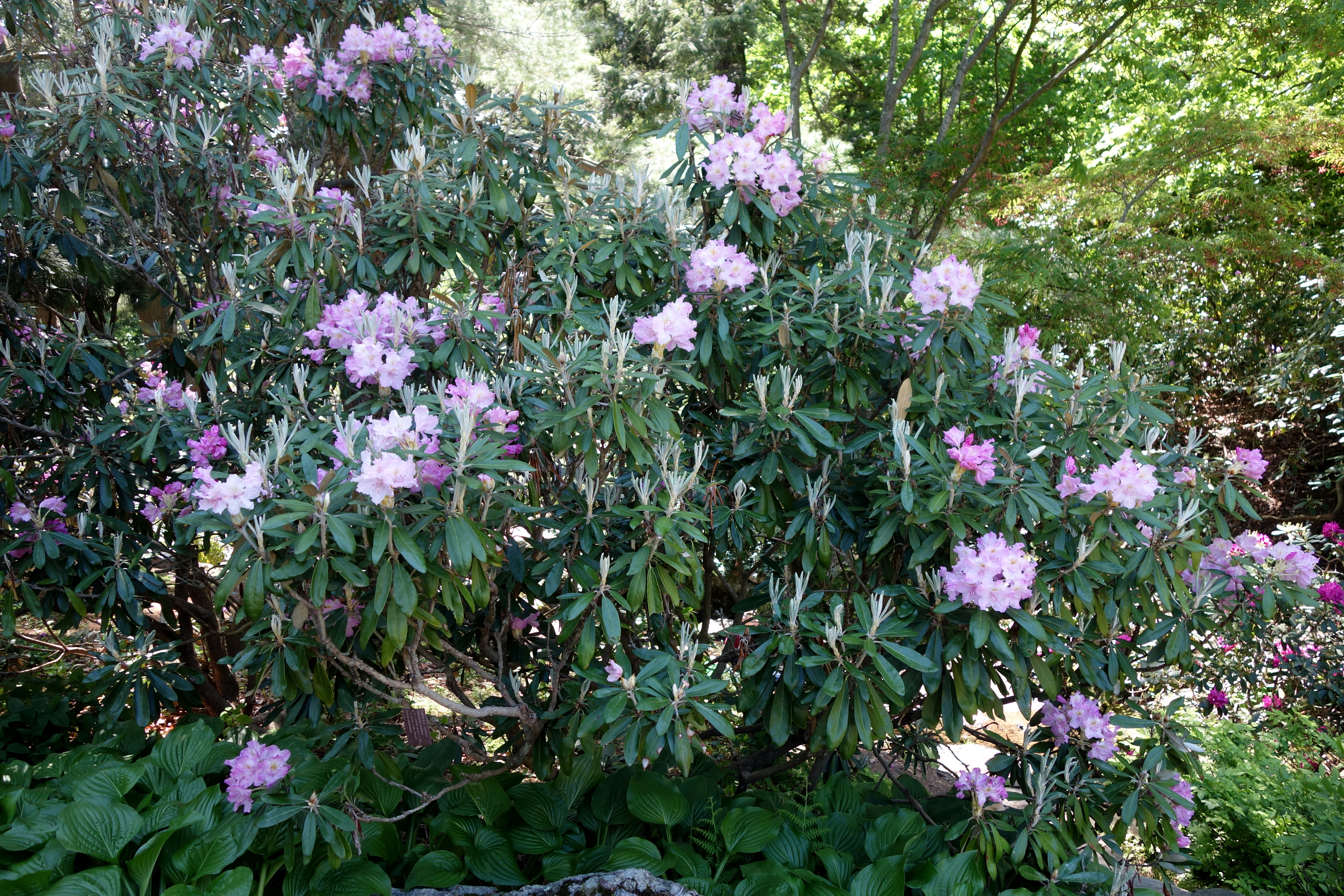
- Habit

Scientific classification
- Kingdom: Plantae
- Clade: Embryophytes
- Clade: Tracheophytes
- Clade: Spermatophytes
- Clade: Angiosperms
- Clade: Eudicots
- Clade: Asterids
- Order: Ericales
- Family: Ericaceae
- Genus: Rhododendron
- Species: R. smirnowii

Binomial name
- Rhododendron smirnowii Trautv. ex Regel

= Rhododendron smirnowii =

Species of flowering plant

Rhododendron smirnowii, the Smirnow rhododendron, is a species of flowering plant in the family Ericaceae, native to northeast Turkey and the western Transcaucasus. In its native habitat it is found up to 2,300 m (7,500 ft) in elevation, and in cultivation is hardy to USDA zone 5 with some protection. Its cultivar 'Vodka' gained the Royal Horticultural Society's Award of Merit in 1991.
