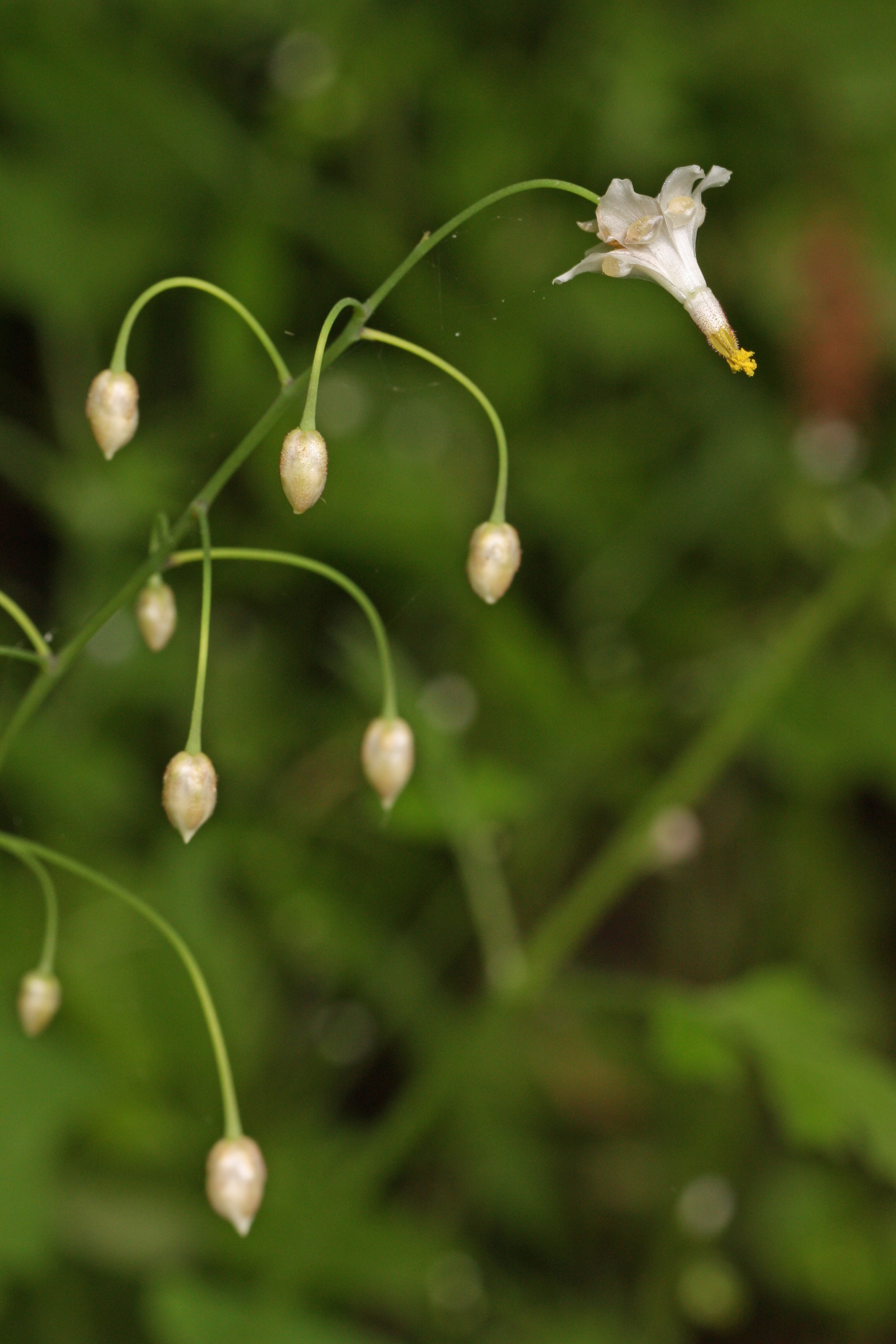
- Vancouveria hexandra in Seattle, Washington

Conservation status
- Apparently Secure (NatureServe)

Scientific classification
- Kingdom: Plantae
- Clade: Tracheophytes
- Clade: Angiosperms
- Clade: Eudicots
- Order: Ranunculales
- Family: Berberidaceae
- Genus: Vancouveria
- Species: V. hexandra

Binomial name
- Vancouveria hexandra (Hook.) C.Morren & Decne.

= Vancouveria hexandra =

Species of flowering plant

Vancouveria hexandra, known as northern inside-out flower, white inside-out flower, or duckfoot, is a perennial herb in the barberry family, Berberidaceae. It has small white flowers and is found in western North America.

== Description ==
Found in patches, the plant grows up to 50 centimetres (20 in) tall with leaves up to 40 cm (16 in) long, with two or three lobes. The small flowers have six short white petals and six petal-like sepals that are bent back (as if in the process of turning inside out, hence the common name), with the pistil and six stamens coming to a point in the center.

== Distribution and habitat ==
It is found in southwestern British Columbia, western Washington and Oregon and northwestern California and is a common understory herb in moist, shady Douglas-fir forests.
