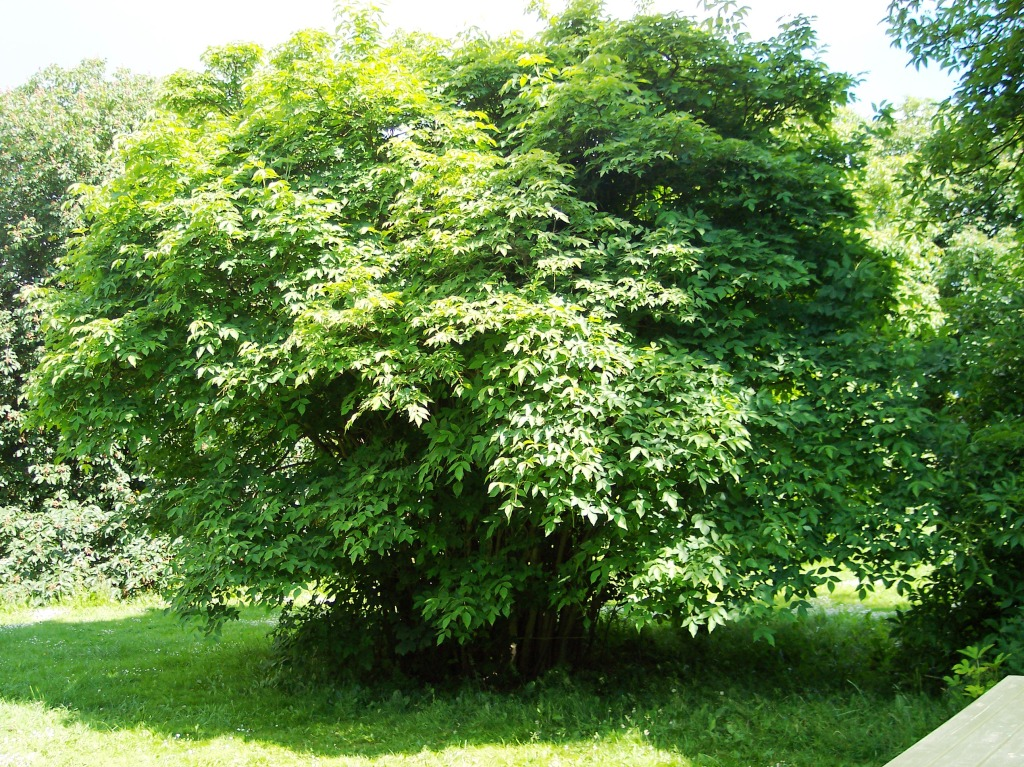
- Staphylea colchica

Scientific classification
- Kingdom: Plantae
- Clade: Tracheophytes
- Clade: Angiosperms
- Clade: Eudicots
- Clade: Rosids
- Order: Crossosomatales
- Family: Staphyleaceae
- Genus: Staphylea; L.

Species
- See text

Synonyms
- Bumalda Thunb.; Euscaphis Siebold & Zucc.; Hebokia Raf.; Staphylis St.-Lag.; Staphylodendron Tourn. ex Mill.; Staphylodendrum Moench

= Staphylea =

Genus of flowering plants

Staphylea, called bladdernuts, is a small genus of 10 or 11 species of flowering plants in the family Staphyleaceae, native to temperate regions of the Northern Hemisphere. The highest species diversity is in China, where four species occur.

They are large shrubs, occasionally small trees, growing to 2–5 m tall. The leaves are deciduous, arranged in opposite pairs, and pinnate, usually with three leaflets, but 76–178 mm (3–7 in) in S. pinnata and 76–127 mm (3–5 in) in S. colchica. The flowers are produced in drooping terminal panicles 5–10 cm long, with 5–15 flowers on each panicle; the individual flowers are about 1 cm long, with the five sepals and petals similar in size and in their white or pale pink colour. The fruit is an inflated papery two- or three-lobed capsule 3–10 cm long, containing a few small nut-like seeds.

== Species ==
Plants of the World Online currently includes:

- Staphylea affinis (Merr. & L.M.Perry) Byng & Christenh.
- Staphylea arguta (Seem.) Byng & Christenh.
- Staphylea bolanderi A.Gray – Sierra bladdernut. Western North America.
- Staphylea bumalda DC. – Japanese bladdernut. Eastern Asia.
- Staphylea campanulata J.Wen
- Staphylea cochinchinensis (Lour.) Byng & Christenh. - Nepal to S. China and Indo-China.
- Staphylea colchica Steven – Colchis bladdernut, jonjoli. Eastern Europe.
- Staphylea emodi Wall. ex Brandis – Himalayan bladdernut. Himalaya.
- Staphylea formosana (Nakai) Byng & Christenh.
- Staphylea forrestii Balf.f. – China.
- Staphylea holocarpa Hemsl. – China.
- Staphylea indochinensis (Merr.) Byng & Christenh. - S. China, N. Vietnam
- Staphylea insignis (Tul.) Byng & Christenh.
- Staphylea japonica (Thunb.) Mabb.
- Staphylea macrosperma (C.C.Huang) Byng & Christenh.
- Staphylea megaphylla (Tul.) Byng & Christenh.
- Staphylea pinnata L. – European bladdernut. Europe.
- Staphylea pringlei S.Watson – Mexico.
- Staphylea shweliensis W.W.Sm. – China.
- Staphylea subsessilifolia (C.Y.Wu) Byng & Christenh.
- Staphylea ternata (Nakai) Byng & Christenh.
- Staphylea tricornuta (Lundell) Byng & Christenh.
- Staphylea trifolia L. – American bladdernut. Eastern North America.
- Staphylea yuanjiangensis K.M.Feng & T.Z.Hsu

Some botanists previously included the closely related genus Turpinia in Staphylea.

== Cultivation and uses ==
Several species are grown as ornamental plants for their flowers and peculiar bladder-like fruit. The popular Staphylea × elegans is a hybrid of unknown origin, probably between S. colchica and S. pinnata. The pickled flowers can be served as a side dish in Georgian cuisine.

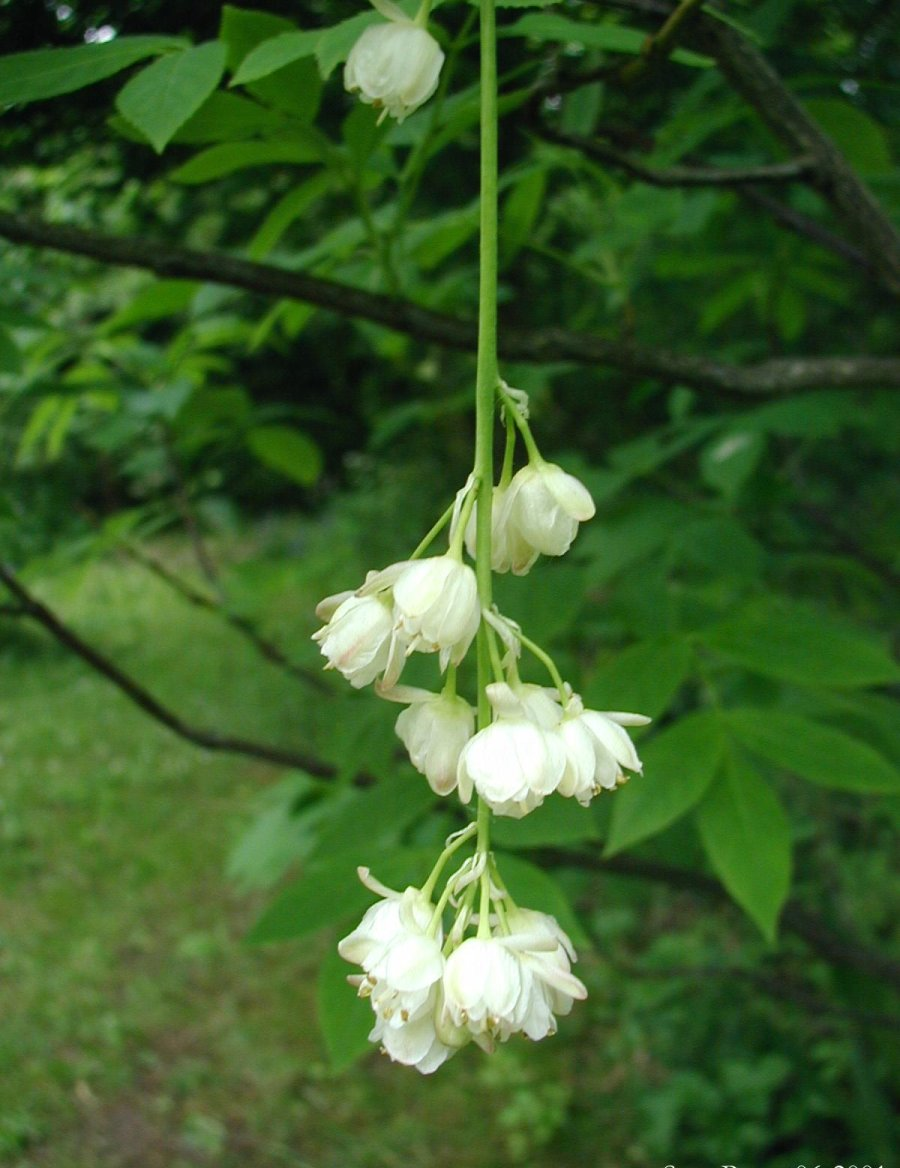
Staphylea pinnata flowers

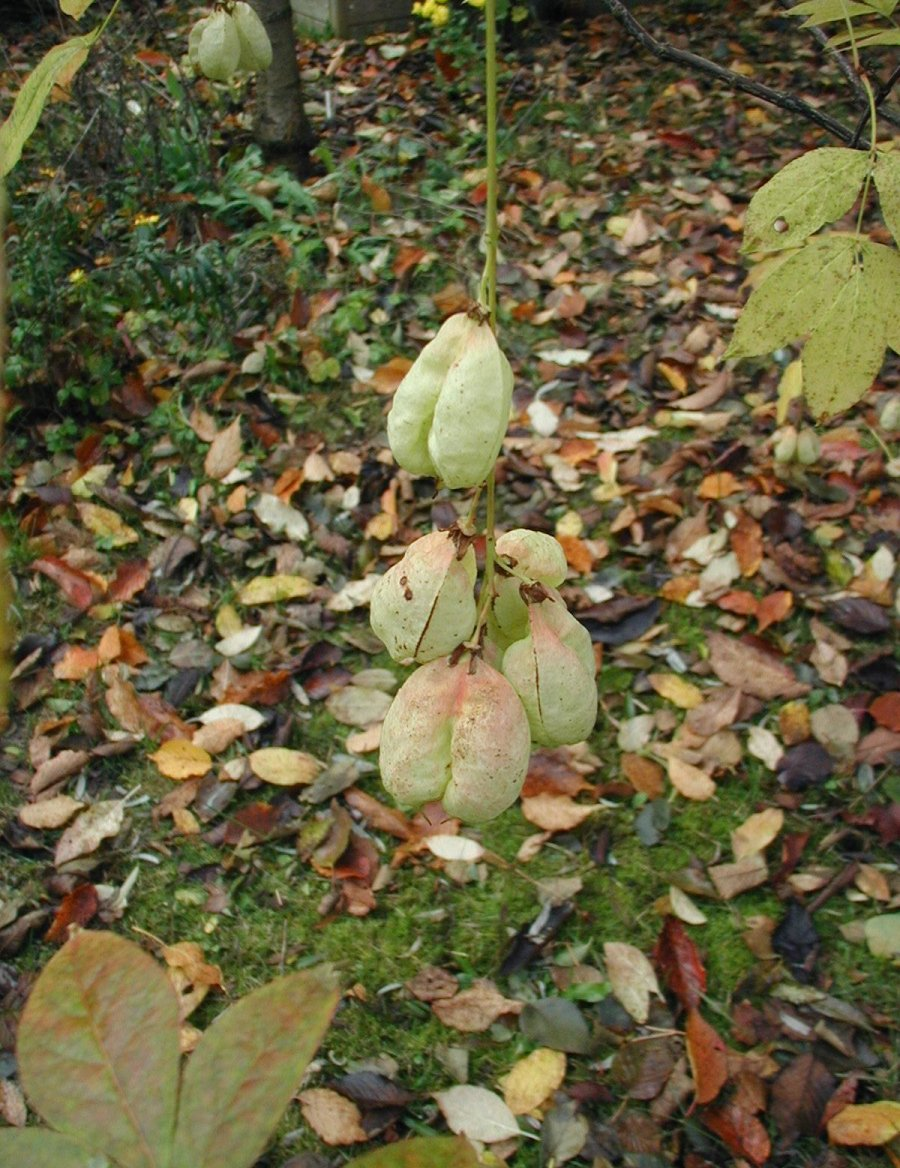
Staphylea pinnata fruit

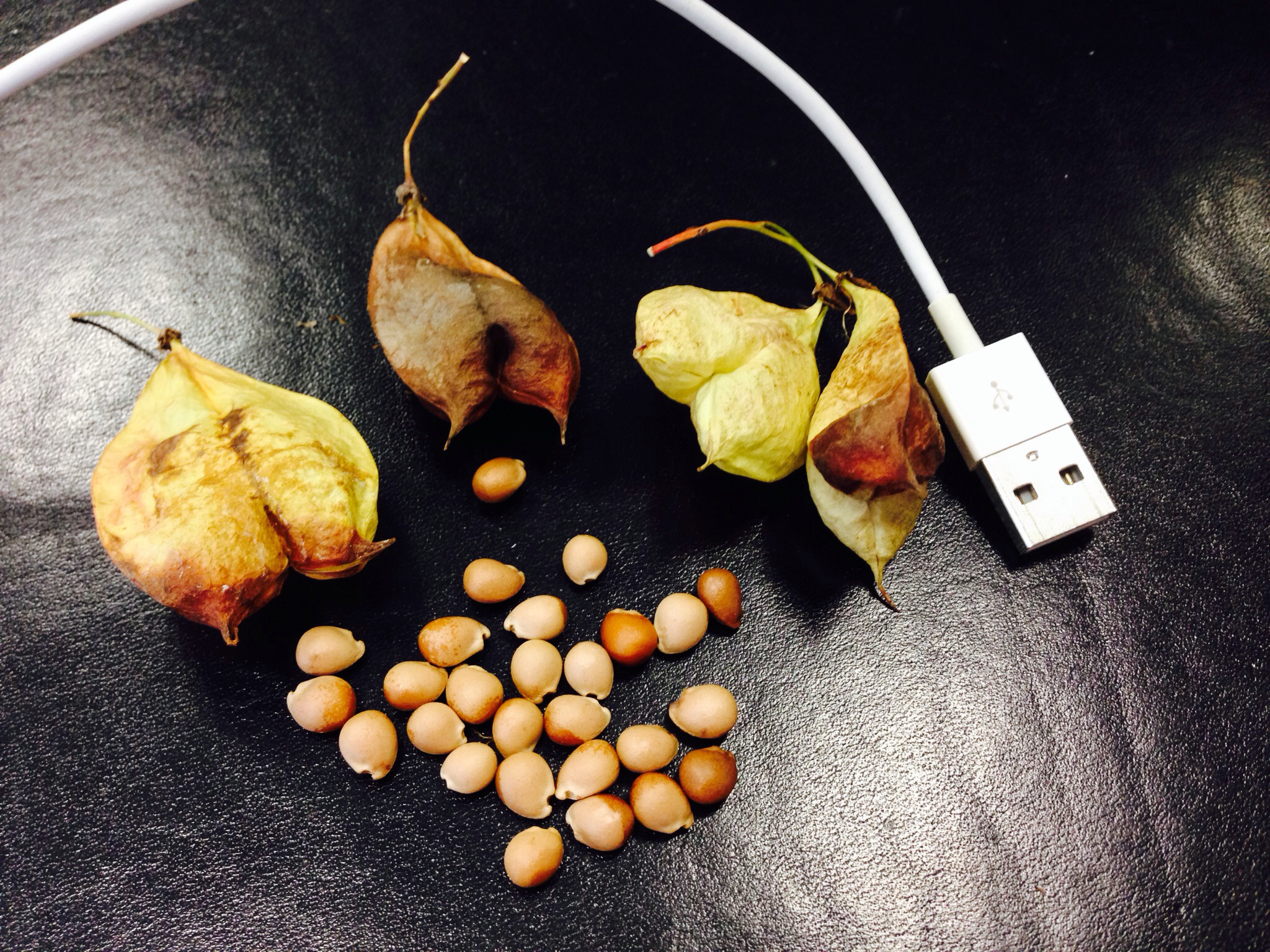
Staphylea pinnata fruit and seeds

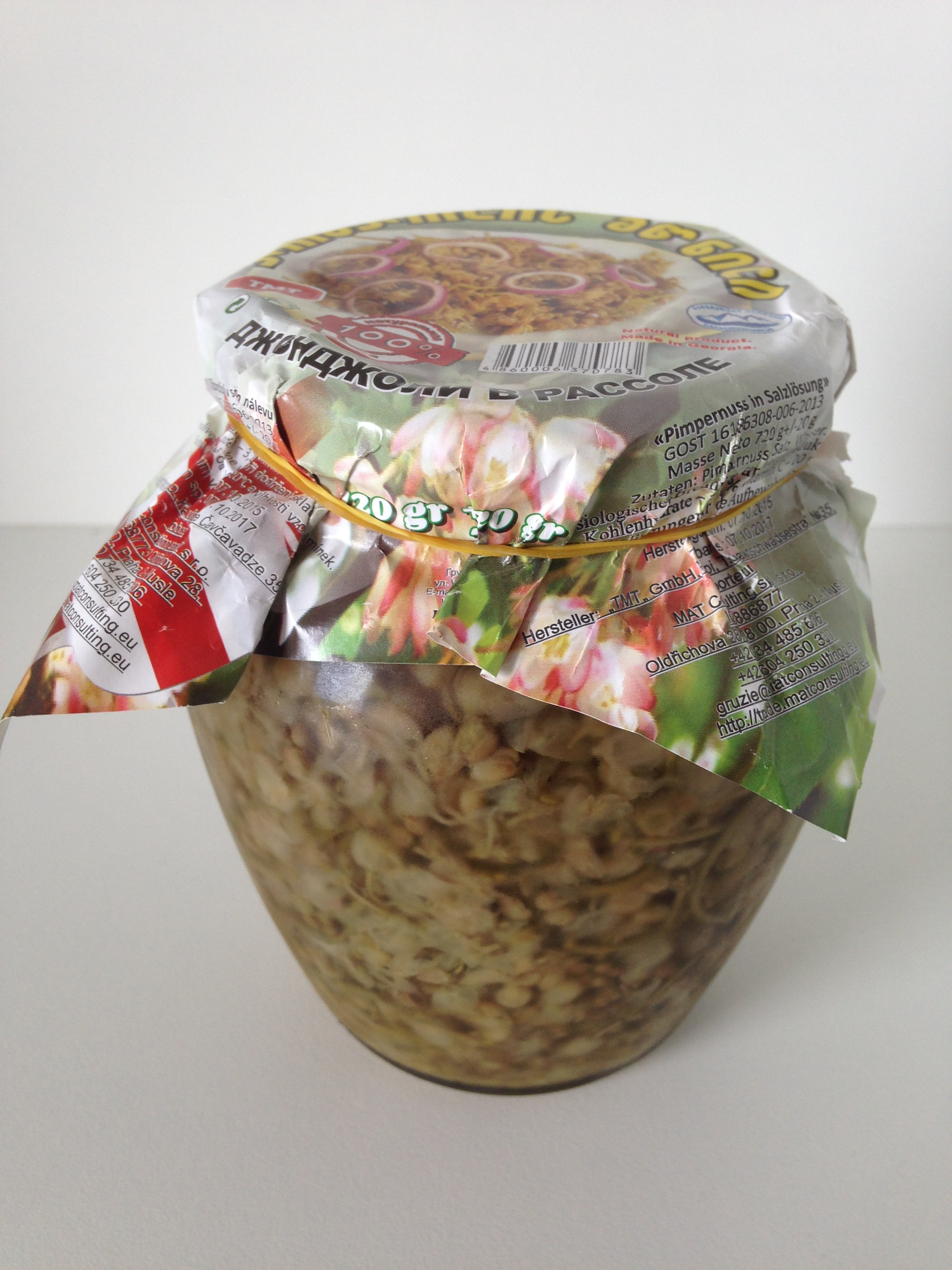
Staphylea colchica pickled flowers
