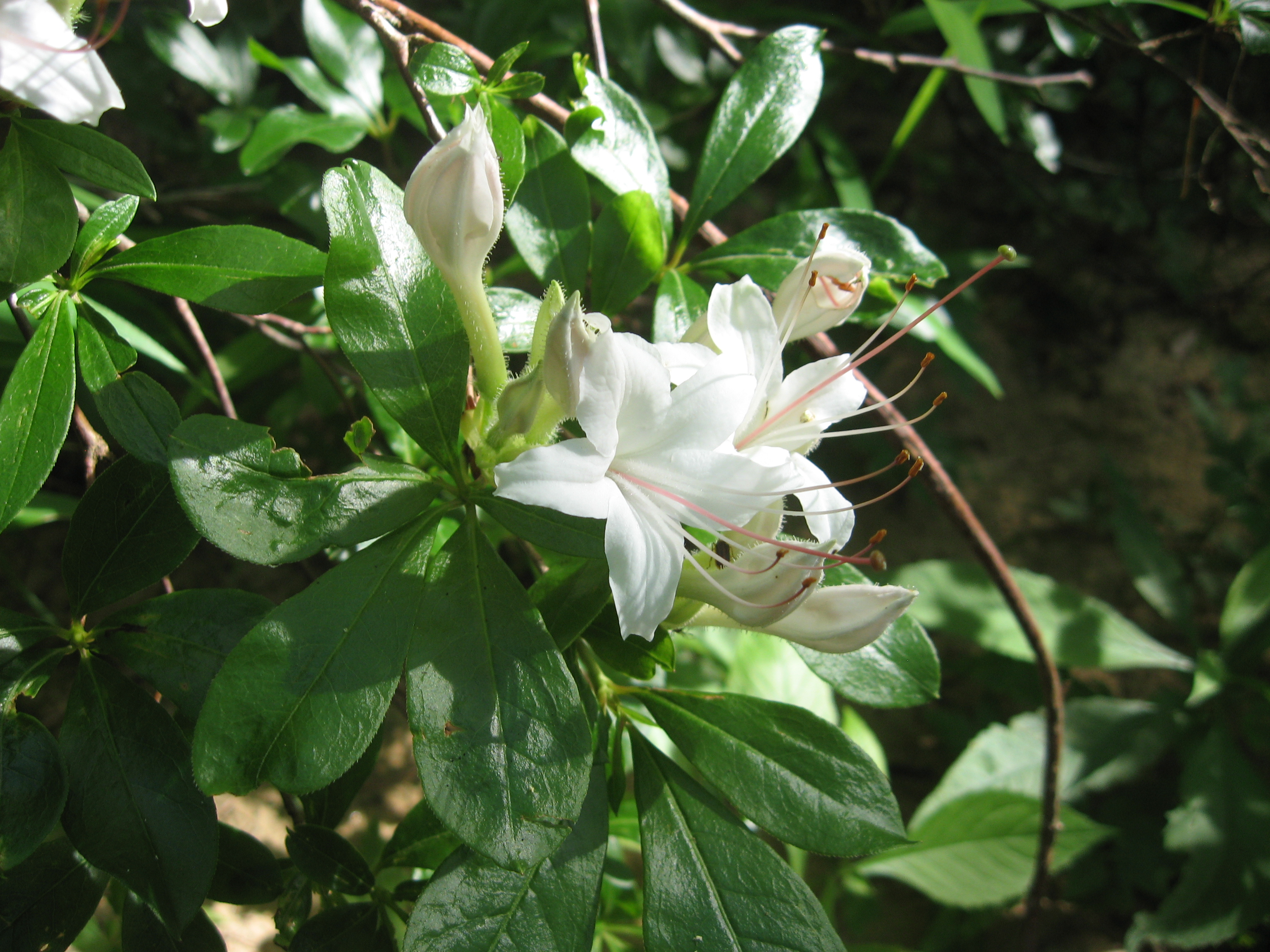

Scientific classification
- Kingdom: Plantae
- Clade: Tracheophytes
- Clade: Angiosperms
- Clade: Eudicots
- Clade: Asterids
- Order: Ericales
- Family: Ericaceae
- Genus: Rhododendron
- Species: R. arborescens

Binomial name
- Rhododendron arborescens (Pursh) Torr.

= Rhododendron arborescens =

Species of flowering plant

Rhododendron arborescens, also known as smooth azalea or sweet azalea, is a species of flowering plant in the family Ericaceae, native to the eastern seaboard of the United States.

It grows to a height of 2.4–3 metres (8–10 ft). Generally blooming in late spring and early summer, the flowers range in color from white to pink with red stamens. The glossy green leaves can also become deep red to purple in the fall. This plant, indigenous to the United States, is generally found growing near moist areas or streams. The plant prefers growth in acidic soil with a pH of 6.8 or less. It grows best in sandy soils above 910 metres (3,000 ft).

The flowers are also known to contain poisonous substances and should not be consumed by humans. The effects of consuming this plant include depression, vomiting, diarrhea, difficulty in breathing, and most dangerously coma.

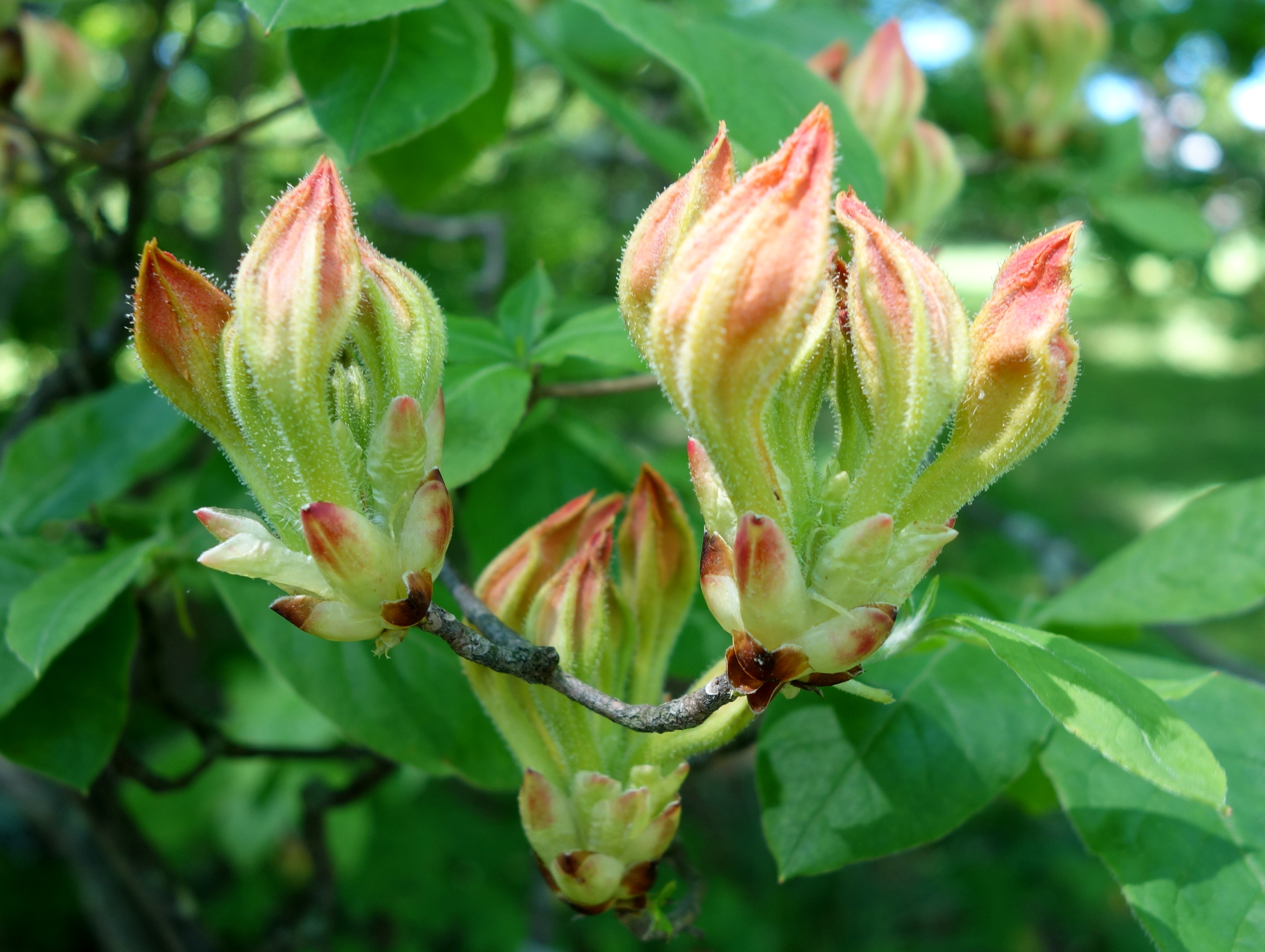
Immature flowers of Rhododendron arborescens

== Description ==
Rhododendron arborescens is a deciduous shrub up to 5.5 m (18 ft) tall, with terminal inflorescences growing from the end of the stems. These plants also generally have yellowish-brown twigs. The green, waxy leaves are 4.4–7.6 cm (1.75–3 in) long, oval and entire with round tips and hairy midribs. Plants found at higher altitudes are generally smaller with smaller leaves. The plant produces from 3 to 7 flowers after a white or blue shade has appeared on the leaves. The stigmas are quite visible all the way up to the petals.

== Taxonomy ==
The official credit for the discovery of R. arborescens goes to Frederick Traugott Pursh and John Bartram. It was first observed in John Bartram's garden in Philadelphia as well as Blue Mountain, Pennsylvania.

It has also been mentioned that the plant was initially noticed by André Michaux in 1795 in the state of North Carolina. However, after further investigation, no more species were found in his conservatory. Therefore, the recognition for the discovery of the plant was given to Frederick Traugott Pursh and John Bartram.

Rhododendron arborescens was first named Azalea arborescens by Pursh in 1814. However, John Torrey renamed it Rhododendron arborescens in 1824 because he believed that it should not be taxonomically separated from the rhododendrons.

The name "sweet azalea" refers to its sweet aroma.

== Distribution and habitat ==
It is distributed in the eastern United States. They are known to grow in parts of West Virginia, Pennsylvania, Tennessee, North Carolina, Georgia and Alabama. They are found among streams near mountains or moist forests. Rhododendron arborescens are generally known as late bloomers. They have a range of blooming from early April till September.

== Cultivation ==
R. arborescens grows best in soil that is slightly acidic at a pH of 5.5–6. It does not grow well in excessive water and drainage is necessary for healthy growth. It is tolerant of full sunlight but must not be overexposed. It is beneficial to plant it with the roots slightly above the ground and accumulating soil up to the plant roots. Organic matter such as sawdust and pinebark may aid the growth of the plant. Depositing a few inches of pine bark or wood chips may help in keeping moisture and preventing weeds from growing around the plant. Mature specimens do not need to be fed with fertilizer.

This plant has gained the Royal Horticultural Society's Award of Garden Merit.

== Toxicity ==
R. arborescens contains andromedotoxins, specifically known as grayanotoxins which are water-soluble diterpenoid compounds. Both the leaf and flowers of this plant are sources of toxins. Consuming as little as 3 milliliter of nectar per kilogram body weight may be highly pernicious.

=== Mechanism ===
Andromedotoxins bind to the Na channels of cell membranes which increases the influx of sodium in the cell and causes extended depolarization. This causes sodium channels to accommodate calcium influx into the cell which also results in depolarization.

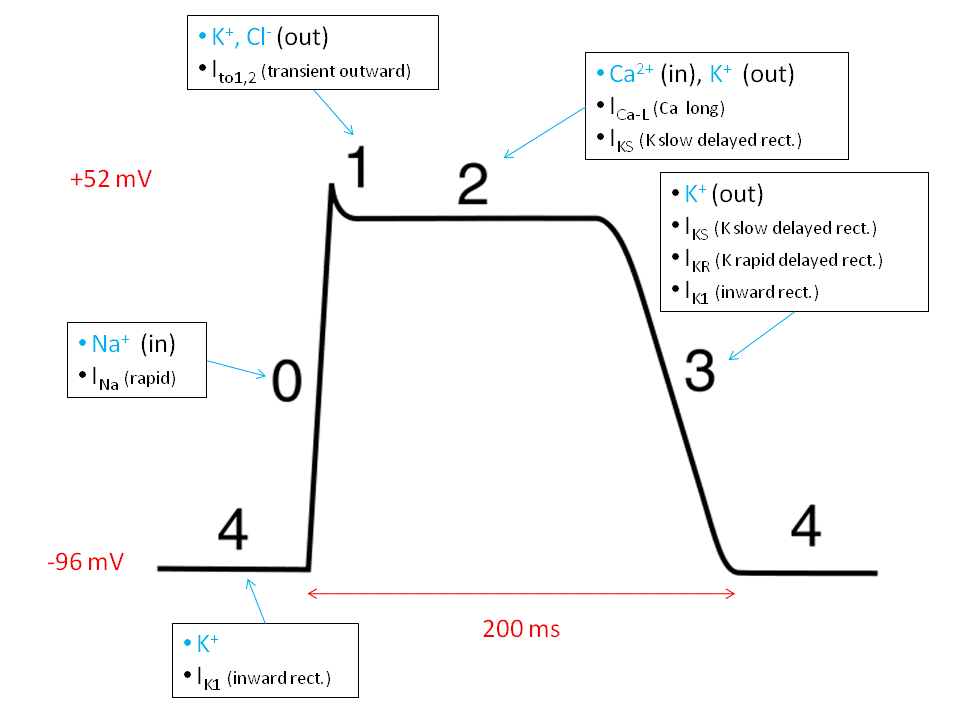
Cardiac action potential

=== Diagnosis ===
Leaf or flower consumption of R. arborescens results in drooling and a blazing sensation in the mouth. This is supplemented with emesis, diarrhea, muscular weakness and weak vision. Other lethal cardiovascular effects include bradycardia, hypotension, and atrioventricular block. Dyspnea, and prostration may develop and someone may die in the span of one to two days.

=== Treatment ===
One way to possibly treat it is to detoxify the body. Emesis, or forcefully vomiting, is one way to rid the body of harmful compounds. Another way to treat it may be to replace the internal body fluid and receive respiratory support. Quinidine is an example of a Na channel blocker which may be helpful in curing heart block.
