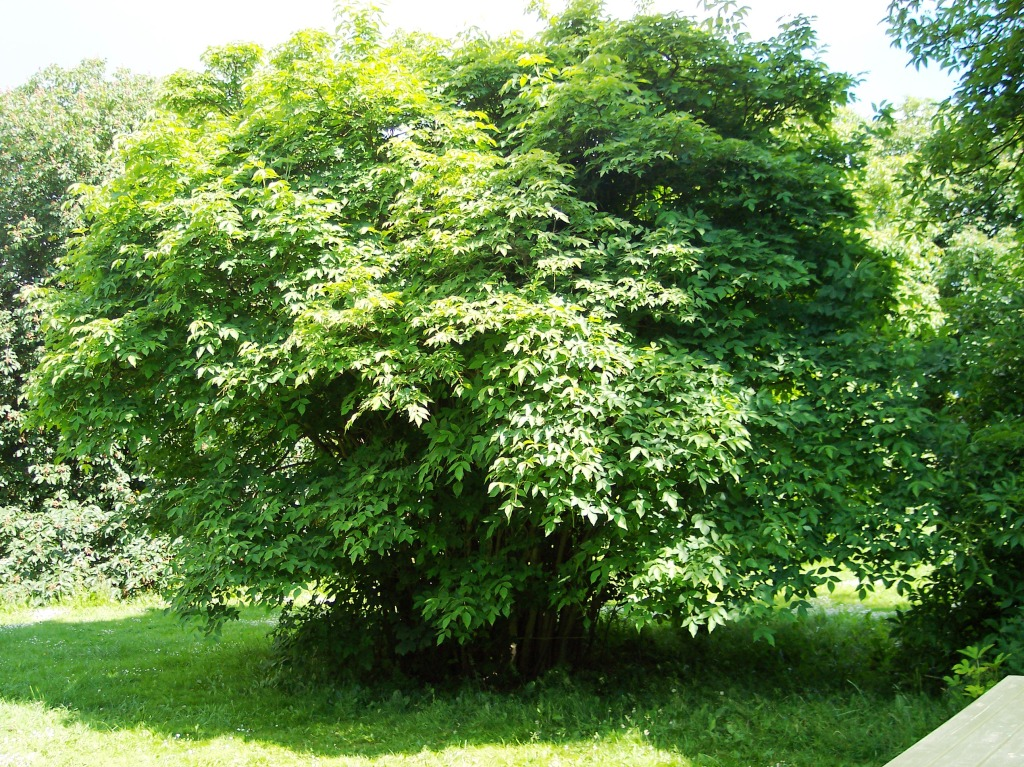

Scientific classification
- Kingdom: Plantae
- Clade: Tracheophytes
- Clade: Angiosperms
- Clade: Eudicots
- Clade: Rosids
- Order: Crossosomatales
- Family: Staphyleaceae
- Genus: Staphylea
- Species: S. colchica

Binomial name
- Staphylea colchica Steven

= Staphylea colchica =

Species of shrub

Staphylea colchica, the Caucasian bladdernut, Colchis bladdernut, or Georgian: ჯონჯოლი, jonjoli or djondjoli, is an ornamental shrub in the Staphyleaceae family. It is native to western Georgia. Its binomial name is derived from the western Georgian kingdom of Colchis.

This small tree (6–10 feet) is a rapidly growing deciduous species. It grows best in well-drained and partly shaded locations. Although it produces fragrant flowers and fruit, it spreads often by suckers.

Its buds, preserved in brine and seasoned with raw onion and vegetable oil, are a common dish in Georgia.

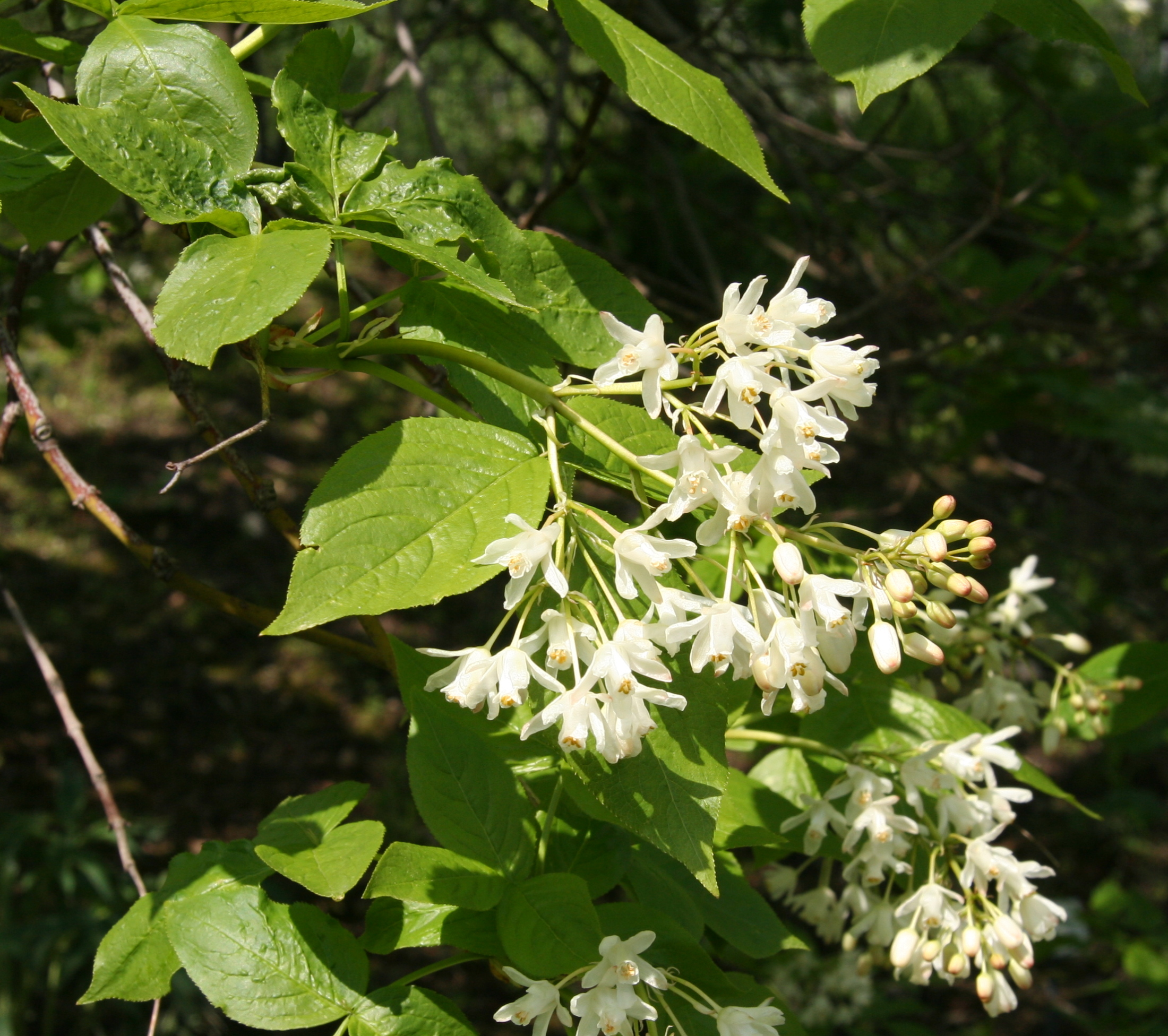
Flowers

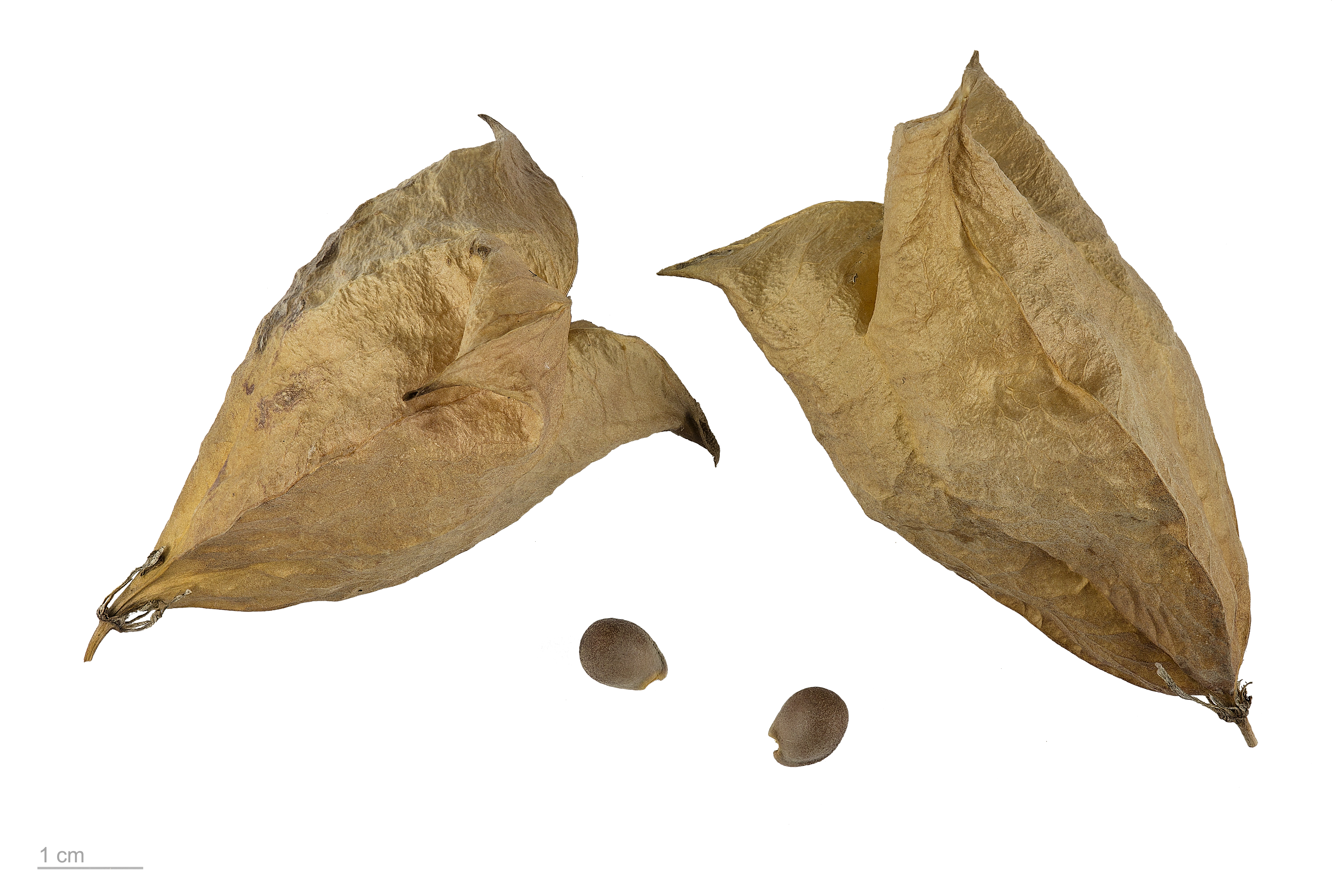
Fruits

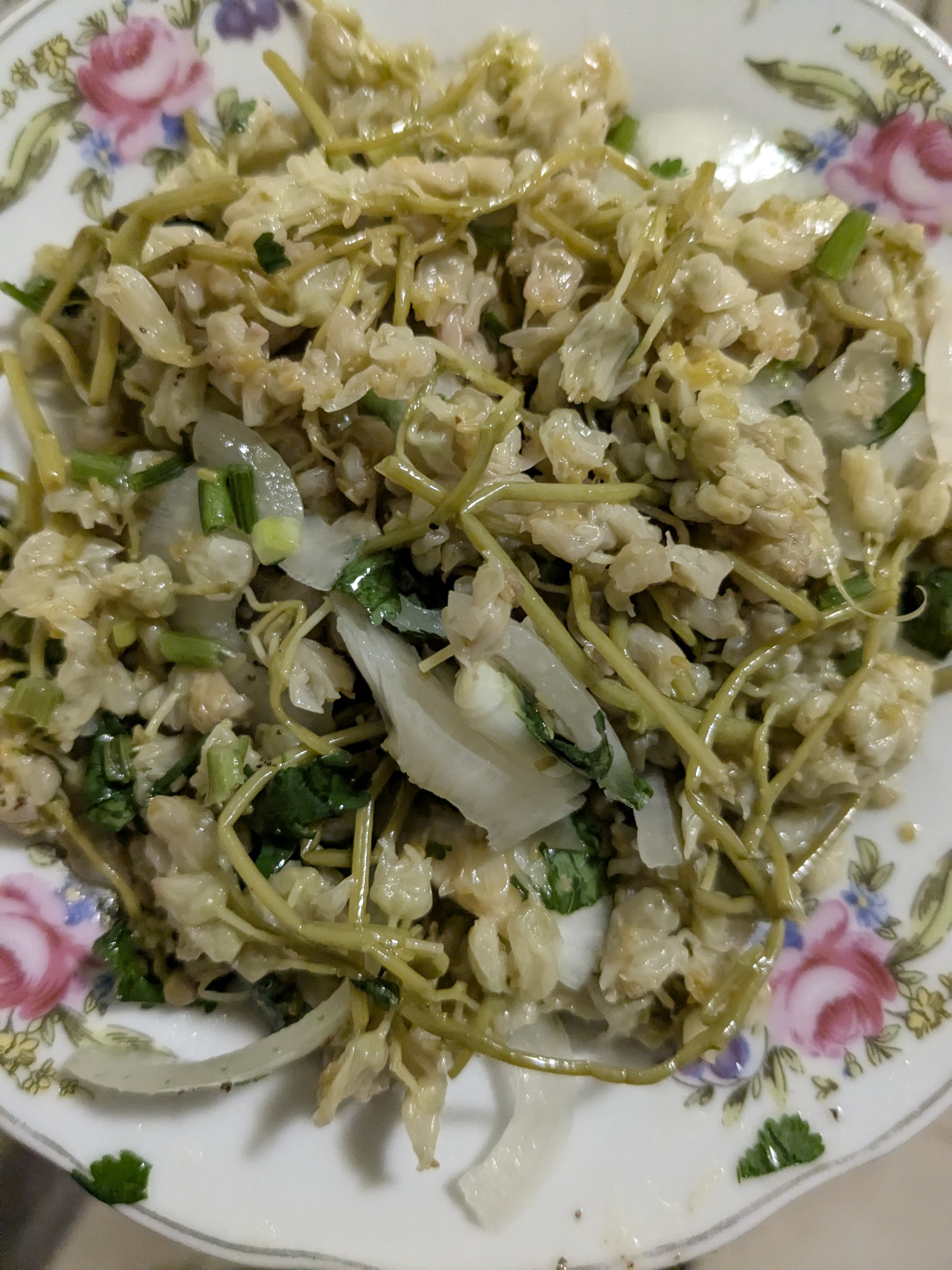
Pickles of Jonjoli with onions and coriander
