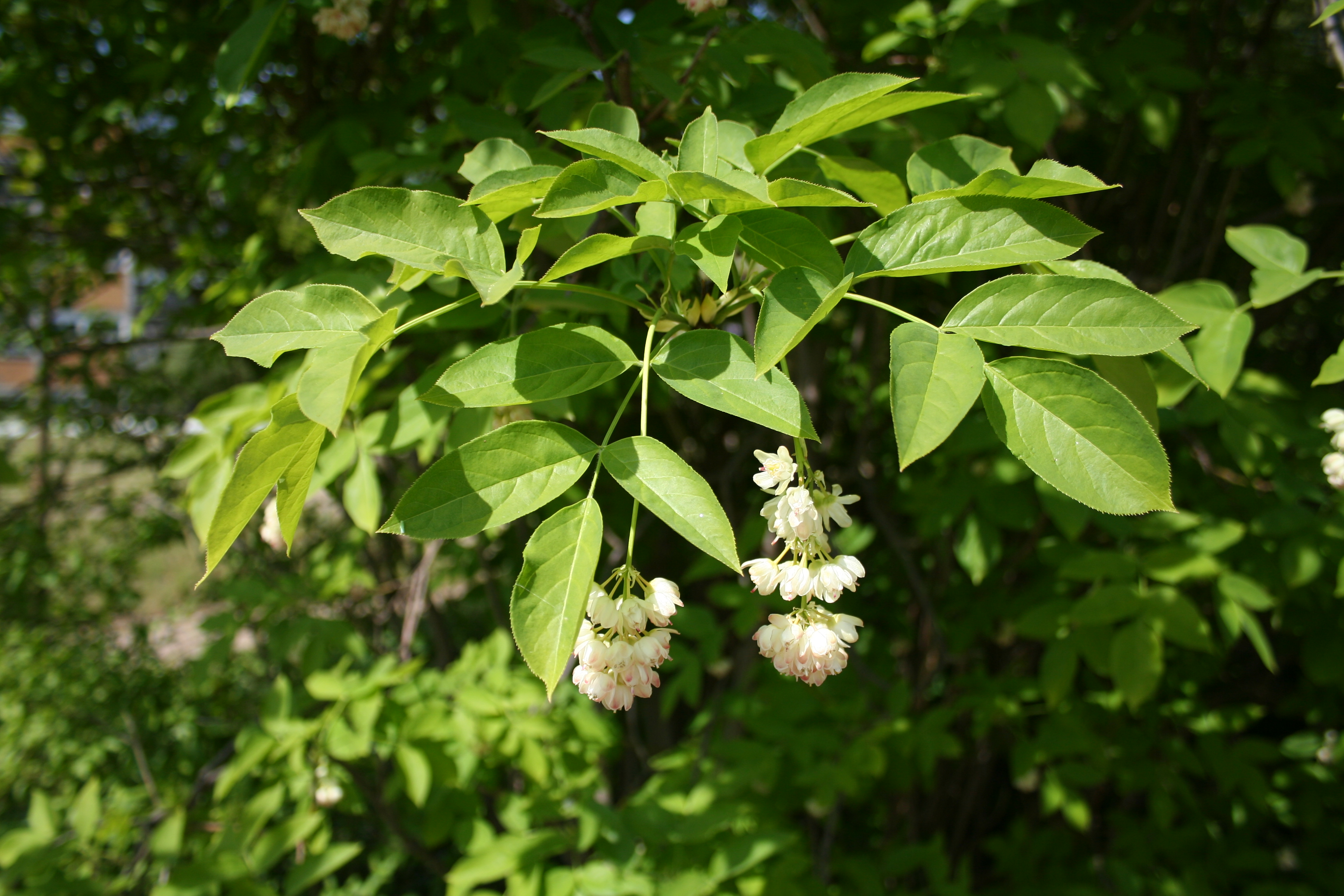

Scientific classification
- Kingdom: Plantae
- Clade: Tracheophytes
- Clade: Angiosperms
- Clade: Eudicots
- Clade: Rosids
- Order: Crossosomatales
- Family: Staphyleaceae
- Genus: Staphylea
- Species: S. pinnata

Binomial name
- Staphylea pinnata L.

= Staphylea pinnata =

Species of shrub

Staphylea pinnata, the European bladdernut, is a species of bladdernut native to Europe and naturalized in Britain.

== Description ==
It is a deciduous shrub growing up to 6 m (20 ft). The species name pinnata refers to the pinnate leaves. Small, white, bell-shaped, fragrant flowers bloom from May to June, on panicles up to 13 cm (5.1 in) long. The flowers are bisexual and pollinated by flies. The fruits are inflated papery capsules, 2-3 lobed, up to 4 cm (1.6 in) long, ripening from September to November. The seeds are edible, and are said to taste like pistachios.

=== Vegetative properties ===
Seed productivity is affected by environmental factors such as forest type and shade level. One bush produces 5 - 10 kg of flowers. One to five seeds are formed in a fruit.

The seeds are oval and brown with a smooth and shiny coat. They reach a size of 1 - 2 cm. The seeds consist of a 0.7 - 1.45 mm thick tegument with an endosperm and an embryo.

== Distribution ==
Staphylea pinnata is the only native species of the Staphyleaceae family in Central Europe. The species can be found between south-eastern Europe and the Anatolian Peninsula and is most abundant in Bulgaria, Romania, Moldova, Hungary, Austria and Croatia. It is legally protected in Poland, Moldova and other European countries.

== Cultivation ==
The shrub's natural habitat is mainly in thermophilous deciduous forests, together with beeches and oak-hornbeam communities.

Staphylea pinnata can be grown in full sun to partial shade. The shrub is ideally planted in nutrient-rich soil with high calcium content. It is hardy in zones 6 - 8 and has a low drought tolerance, which is why the soil should not dry out during growing season. The shrub also does not tolerate water logging. Staphylea pinnata is often found near water effusions, limestone outcrops or cliffs, and on steep valley slopes.

It can be planted in spring, as soon as the ground is frost-free. It is important to leave a generous amount of space between this shrub and other plants to allow the bladdernut to spread out. Otherwise, the plant is undemanding and not susceptible to insect pests or diseases. It rarely needs pruning. However, it tolerates pruning well and can be thinned out occasionally.

Staphylea pinnata develops with great reproductive effect and its generative renewal is high. Two years after planting, the first seeds can be harvested.

== Human consumption ==
Both the seeds and the flowers are edible.

The flowers are thick-fleshed with a sourish taste and they can be eaten fresh or processed. The candid flowers are delicate sweets. In Georgia, flowers are fermented similar to Sauerkraut and can be eaten as a salad to bet a caper-like dish. This traditional dish is called Jonjoli. Traditionally, also the flowers of Staphylea colchica are used for Jonjoli.

The seeds can be eaten whether they are unripe or ripe. When unripe, the seed shell is still soft and therefore edible raw. The ripe seeds have to be opened with a hammer and they taste similar to pistachio. Slightly roasted, they are a nice topping for salads and desserts. From the nuts, also liqueur is produced.
