= Georgian cheese =

Varieties of cheese produced in Georgia

This is a list of Georgian cheeses. Over 250 varieties of cheese are produced in Georgia.

== Georgian cheeses ==
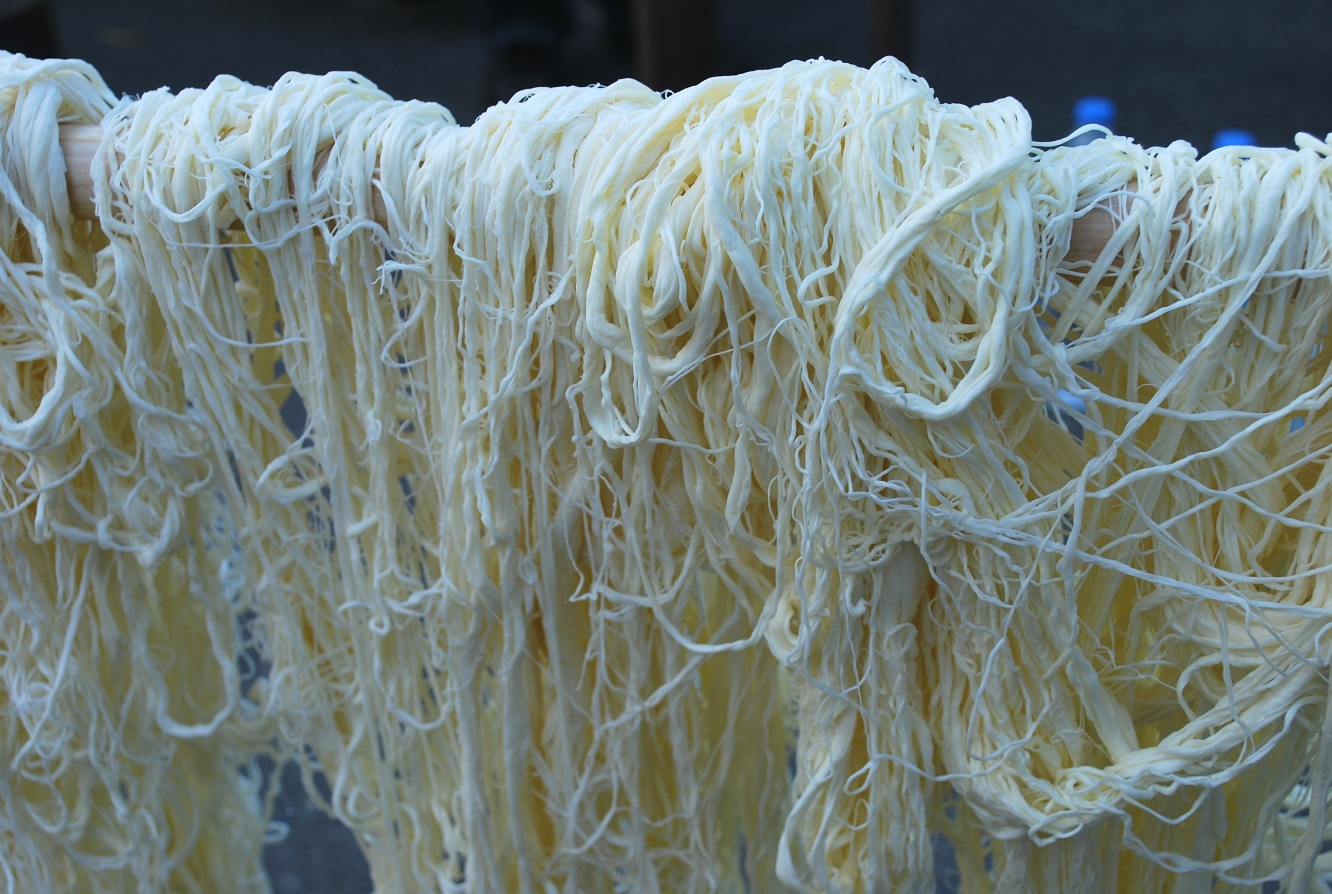
Tenili cheese

- Dambalkhacho
- Guda, cheese from eastern Georgia's mountain region
- Imeruli, cheese from Imereti region
- Kalti
- Rotten cheese
- Sulguni, cheese from Samegrelo region. It is sometimes smoked.
- Svanetian marchvi
- Tenili cheese, a variety of string cheese from Meskheti region of southern Georgia. In 2013, it was inscribed on the list of Intangible cultural heritage of Georgia.

== See also ==
- Georgian cuisine
- Khachapuri – a traditional Georgian dish of cheese-filled bread
- List of cheeses
