= Achma =

Georgian dish

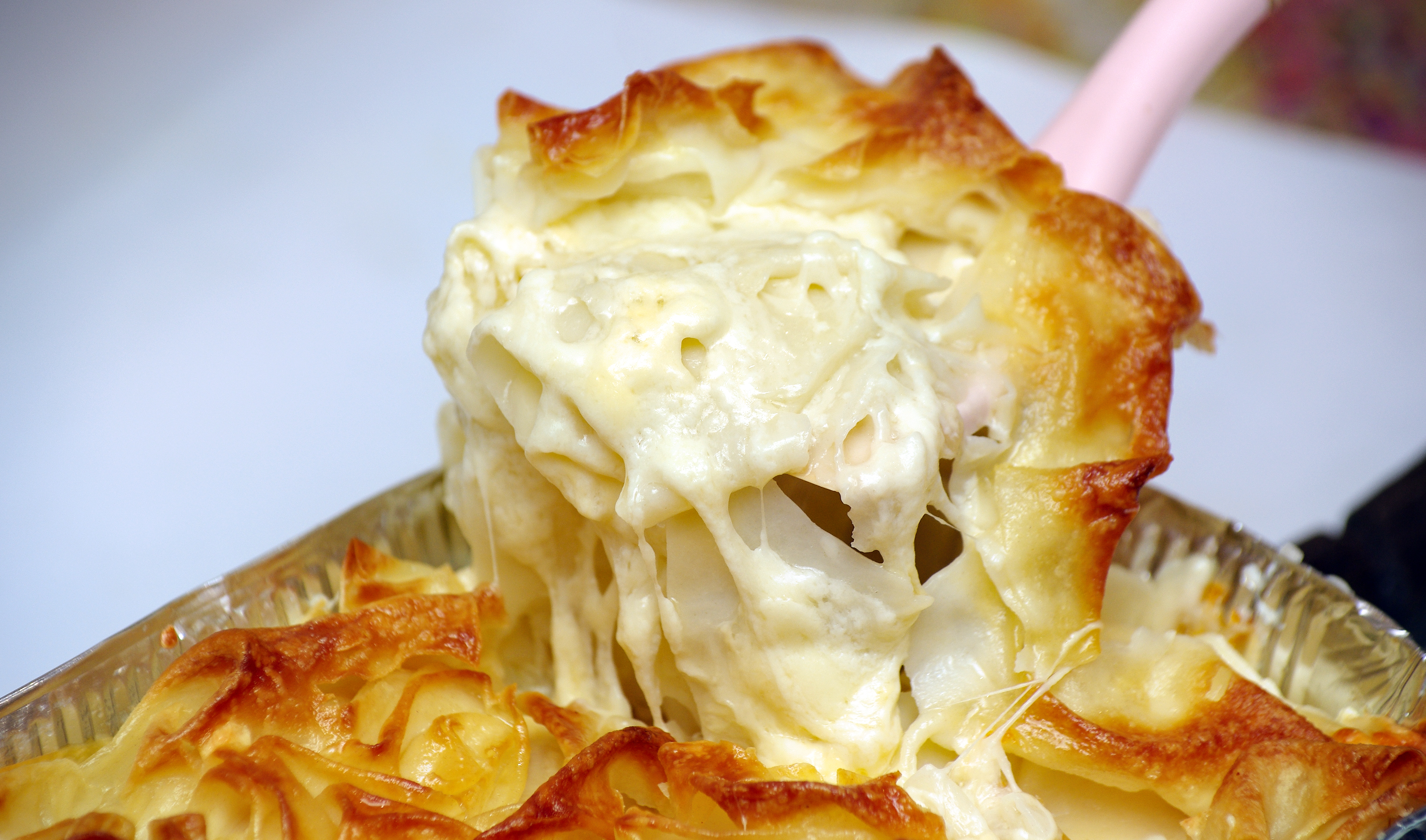
- Place of origin: Georgia
- Region or state: Adjara
- Serving temperature: hot
- Main ingredients: style of khachapuri

Achma (Georgian: აჩმა, romanized: achma) is a traditional Georgian dish and a variety of khachapuri from region of Adjara.

== History ==
Achma is prepared using a large number of dough layers, which are briefly parboiled to prevent them from sticking together. Traditionally, the sulguni cheese is used as the filling. It is either sliced or grated and sprinkled between each layer of dough. Other cheeses may also be used, or one can opt for a blend of 50% sulguni and 50% imeruli cheese. To ensure a moist texture, the dough layers may be brushed with butter. The baking pan, filled with the layered dough and cheese, is placed into an oven or traditional stove to bake Achma. The fundamental principle behind preparing Achma is that the dough must be unsweetened, while the cheese must be salty.

The dish is typically served hot. It is particularly convenient because it reheats exceptionally well—its flavor remains completely undiminished, which is why it is commonly prepared in large baking pans.

== See also ==
- Kubdari
- Lobiani
