= Nadugi =

Georgian dish

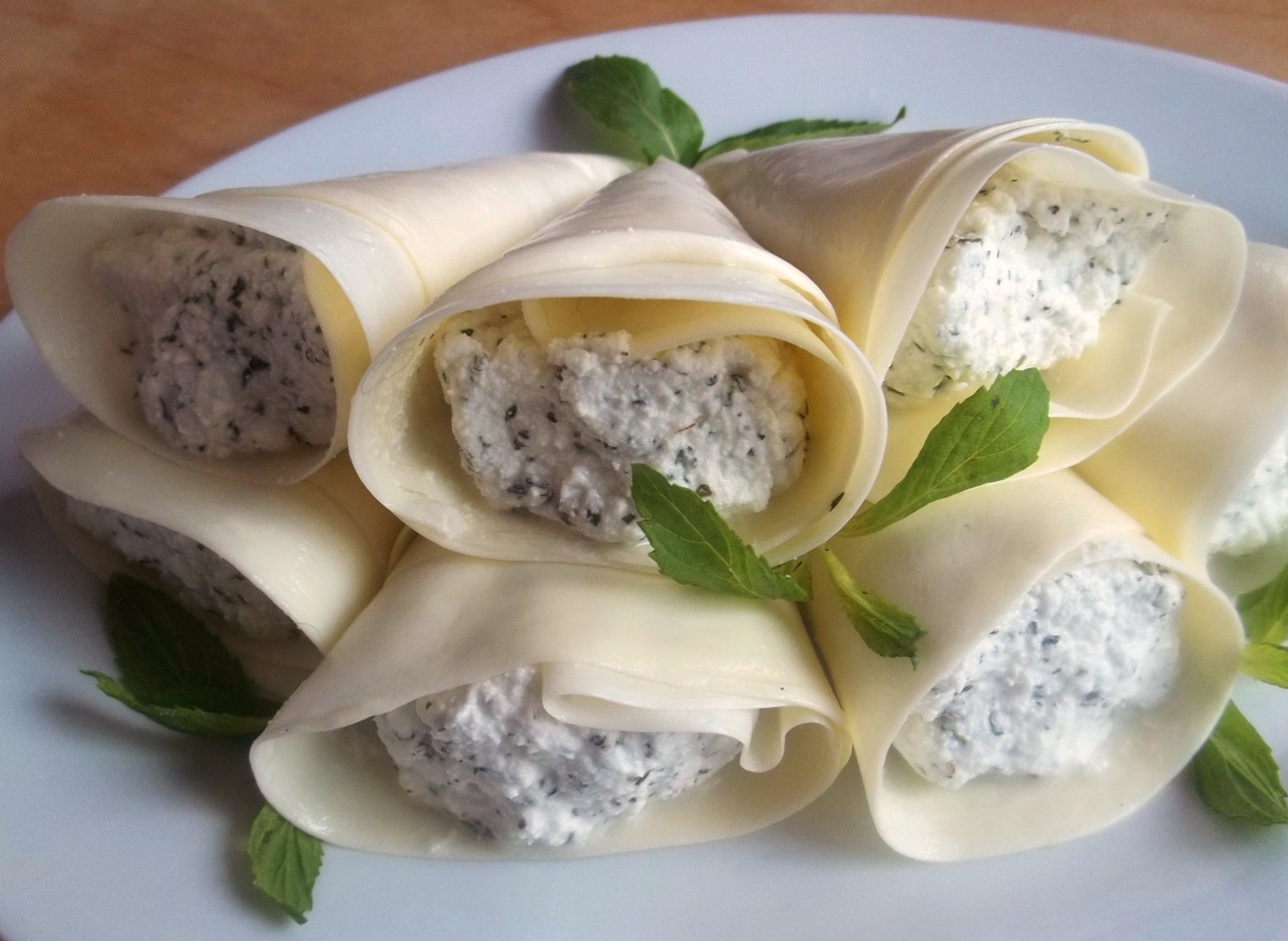
- Nadugi with mint wrapped in sulguni
- Type: cow milk
- Region or state: Western Georgian regions

Nadugi (Georgian: ნადუღი, romanized: nadughi, lit. 'second boiling') (Note: It may also be referred as Nadughi.) is a traditional Georgian soft cheese appetizer or spread.

== History ==
Nadugi is often described as a delicate dairy product similar to ricotta or curd. It is made by heating cheese whey until curds rise, it is commonly mixed with fresh mint, chili peppers, and salt, then served wrapped in thin sulguni cheese slices or with pomegranate and bread. Nadugi is made from the whey of cow's milk and is often served mixed with fresh herbs. It is virtually fat free and is considered a good preventive against sclerosis. Even though Nadugi is popular all around Georgia, the western regions of the country have more of Nadugi-influenced dishes, particularly Samegrelo, Guria and Adjara.

== See also ==
- Dambalkhacho
- Guda cheese
