= Chkinti =

Georgian cheese

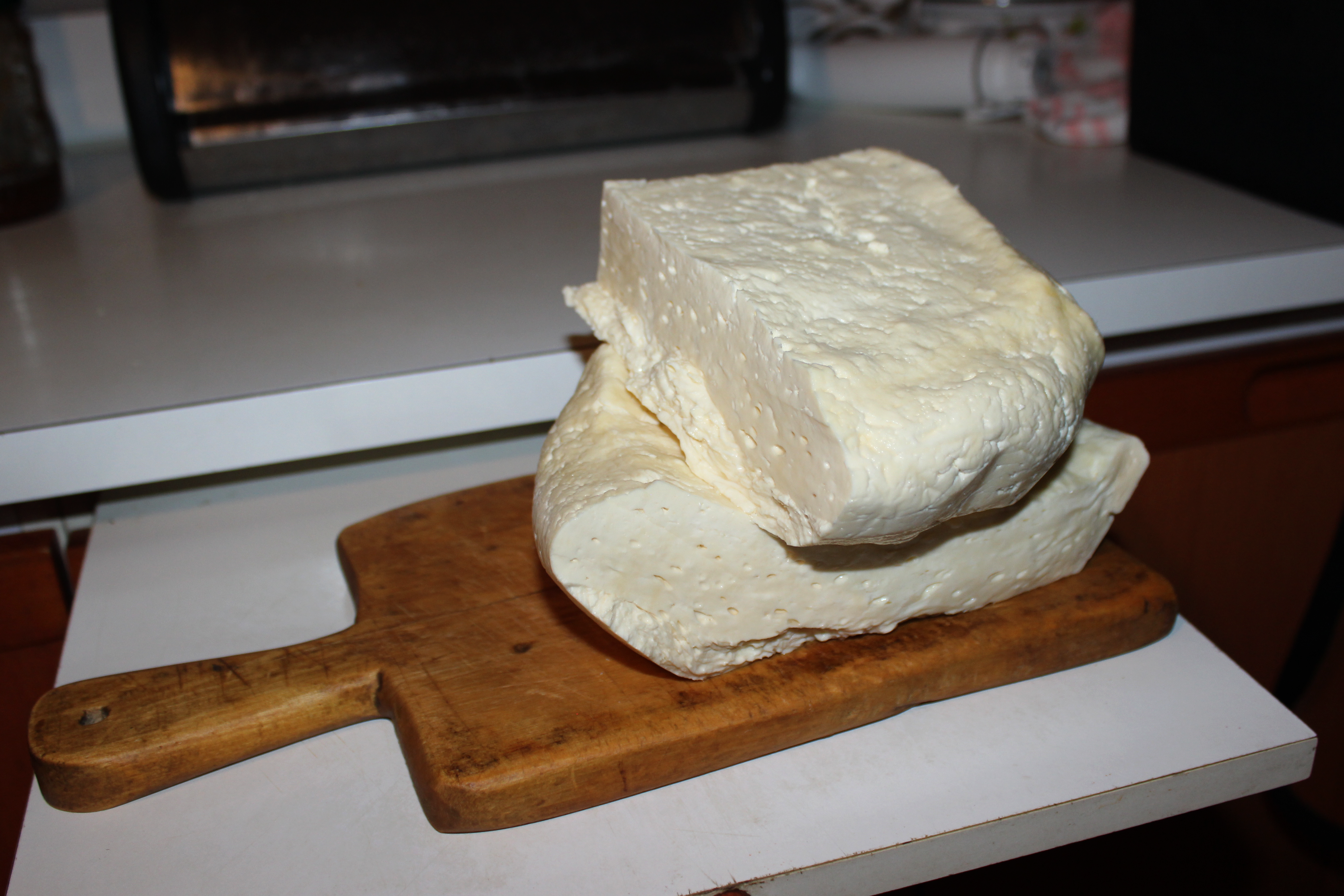
- Type: cow milk
- Region or state: Imereti, Georgia

Chkinti (Georgian: ჭყინტი ყველი, lit. 'fresh cheese') (Note: It may also be referred as Imeretian cheese or simply Imeruli.) is a traditional Georgian cheese from Imereti region of the country.

== History ==
Chkinti cheese belongs to the group of unboiled cheeses and is made from cow's milk. Because it is hand-made, it is called hand-made cheese. When the milk mass has curdled properly, chkinti is stirred by hand, after which the mass is strained and removed. By slowly squeezing with both hands, the mass is freed from excess whey, but in such a way that sufficient moisture is extracted, which is one of the main conditions for cheese ripening. The squeezed, rounded cheese is placed on a wooden or clay tray, where it swells. The cheese is removed in the morning and left in the tray until evening and then salt is added. Salt contributes to the ripening of the cheese and the development of the stones. The cheese, fixed and salted on the clay tray, is then transferred to a large storage room. Cheese curds were stored in a farm shed, in a dark place, or in pits or pits dug into the ground (in general, darkness and cover are one of the guarantees for storing cheese), where they would remain unchanged in taste for up to a year.

Chkinti is a traditional ingredient for imeruli khachapuri. Chkinti, alongside with sulguni, is the most widespread cheese in Georgia; these two varieties account for up to 80% of all cheese produced in the country.

== See also ==
- Guda cheese
