= Rachuli ham =

Georgian ham

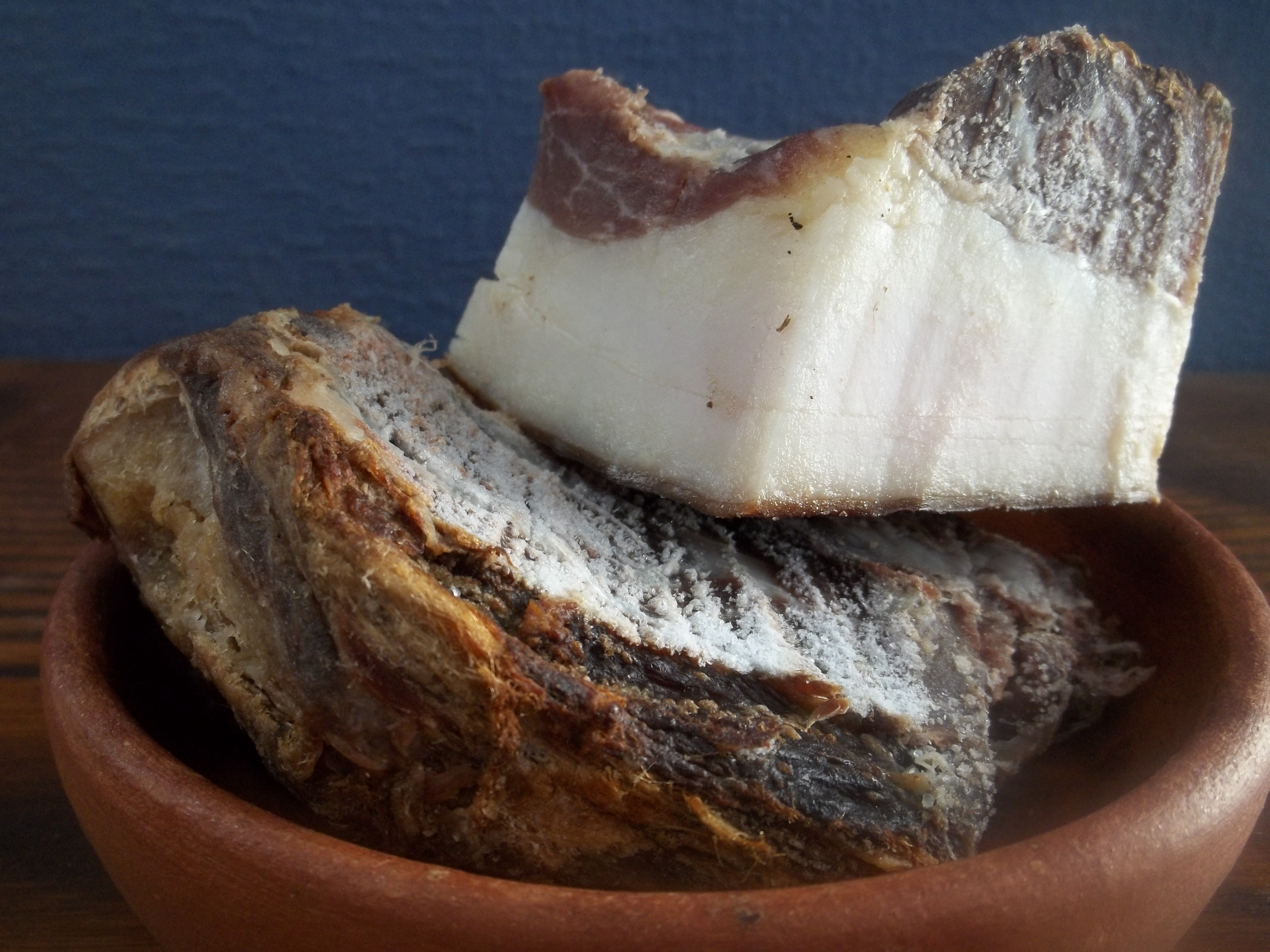
- Type: ham
- Region or state: Racha, Georgia

Rachuli ham (Georgian: რაჭული ლორი, romanized: rach'uli lori) (Note: It may also be referred as Racha ham or Rachan ham.) is a traditional Georgian bacon and smoked ham from Racha, a mountainous region of western Georgia.

== History ==
In Racha, pigs roam freely in the forests, where they feed on apples, pears, cherries, and other fruits. Pig farming is one of the main agricultural activities in the region. To prepare Rachuli ham, a pig is traditionally slaughtered in November. After slaughter, the pig is cut lengthwise into two pieces.

Each piece is called a peliki (ფელიკი). The peliki is placed in a perennial wooden barrel and after 4 days, the it is turned over and left for another 7-8 days. Right after that, the peliki is hung to dry at room temperature for 5 days. Then, the pelikis are smoked under the roof, in chambers simply made of planks, for 40 days. A fire is lit below, preferably several types of wood logs (beech, fir and oak) are burned together. The firewood burns without a flame and releases smoke, which gives the ham a specific aroma and taste. The characteristic brownish-reddish color of Rachuli ham indicates the high quality of the ham. The fat and lean meat are distributed in layers.

Racha ham has been an integral part of the festive table and the Georgian diet since ancient times. When the people of Racha traveled long distances, they would take ham with them as a snack, (Note: Similar tradition as with Churchkhela.) because it is nutritious and non-perishable. In local cuisine of Racha, a traditional Georgian dish, lobiani, is made with Rachuli ham.

Due to the popularity of Rachuli ham in the country and abroad, the increase in the volume and speed of production has led to violations of production technology, which affects the quality of the final product. For example, the use of imported frozen meat or artificial smoking methods.

== See also ==
- Lobiani
- Guda cheese
