= Tenili =

Georgian cheese

- Type: sheep milk
- Region or state: Meskheti, Georgia

Tenili (Georgian: ტენილი ყველი, romanized: t'enili q'veli, lit. 'stuffed cheese') (Note: It may also be referred as Meskhuri tenili.) is a traditional Georgian string cheese from Meskheti region of the country. Tenili cheese is known to be made with the most complicated production techniques of all Georgian cheeses and is enrolled in UNESCO's world heritage list.

== History ==
Tenili cheese is produced in small quantities by families and dairy companies in the Georgian region of Samtskhe-Javakheti. Fresh sheep's milk is left to stand until a layer of cream forms. This cream is skimmed off, and the milk is allowed to rest for 24 hours. The cheese "braiding" process is through stretching and folding accompanied by constant dipping into hot whey; this stage lasts up to 25 minutes. Once the cheese mass has transformed into fine strands, it is transferred to cold water, where care is taken to ensure the strands do not stick together. The next stage involves soaking the cheese in salted water for 15 minutes. Afterward, the cheese is hung over a wooden bar for 10 hours; during this time, excess liquid drains away and the cheese dries slightly. The strands are then cut and left on a table, covered with a towel, for one or two days, after which they are coated with the cream that was skimmed off at the beginning of the production process. The final stage is the cheese's maturation in a clay pot into which it is tightly stuffed (hence the name of a cheese) to ensure no air pockets remain; the pot is then placed upside down, with its mouth resting on a board covered in ash, which absorbs the residual cream as it drains out. In this position, the cheese matures for approximately two months.

== See also ==
- Chkinti
- Guda cheese
