= Lobiani =

Traditional Georgian dish

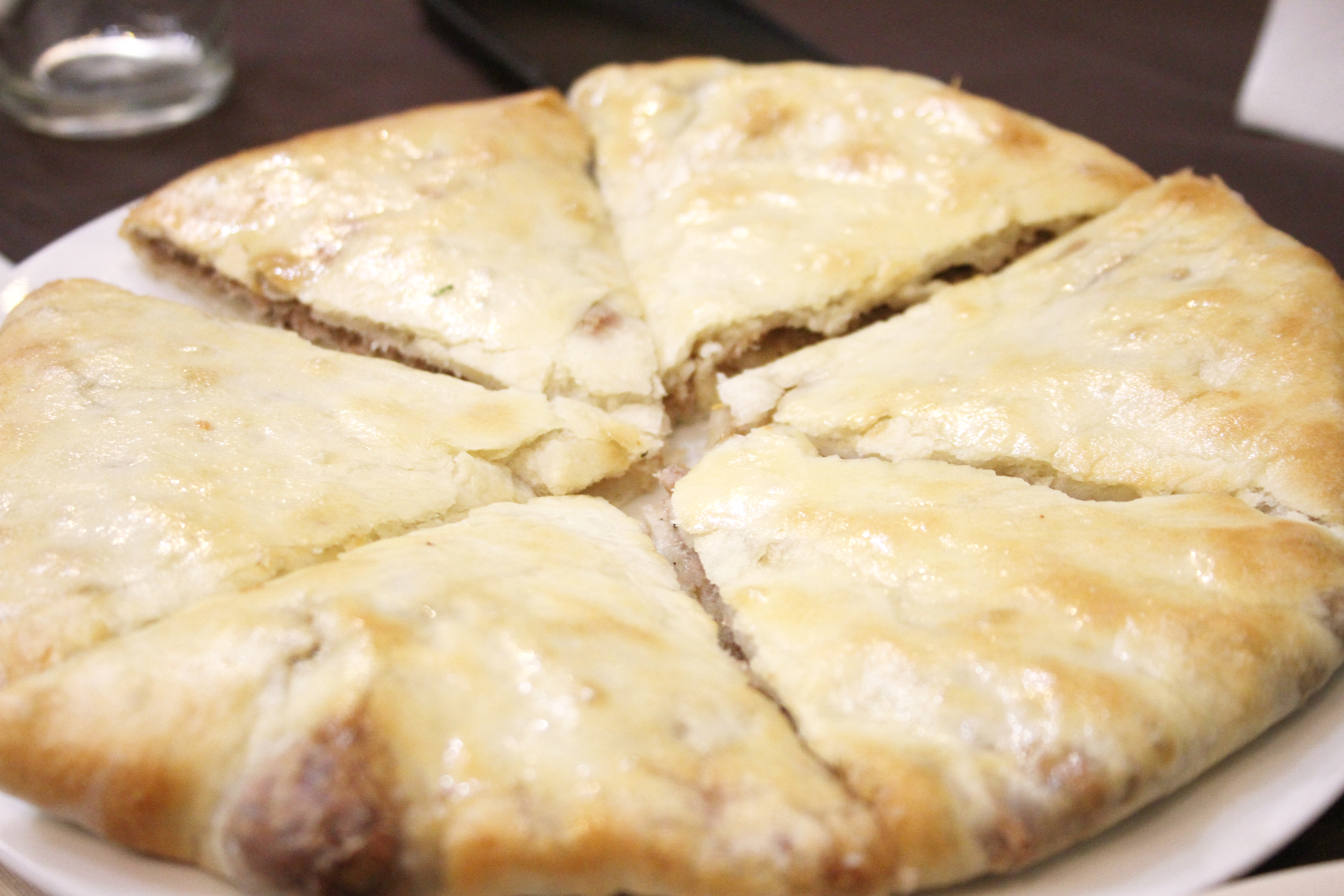
- Place of origin: Racha, Georgia
- Main ingredients: Lobio beans

Lobiani (Georgian: ლობიანი) is a traditional Georgian dish of bean-filled bread. In Georgia the most popular is Rachuli Lobiani (რაჭული ლობიანი), like a Khachapuri, but with beans. It is often paired with Rachuli ham.

The word Lobiani comes from the Georgian word for beans, which is ლობიო (Lobio). This Lobio, or the kidney beans, is the most important ingredient for making Lobiani.

The dough for lobiani is made using matsoni. It is prepared in the same way as Imeretian khachapuri, but requires more kneading. Pre-boiled beans are used for the filling.

== See also ==
- Lobio
- Matsoni
- Khachapuri
