= Dambalkhacho =

- Country of origin: Georgia
- Region: Tianeti and Pshavi
- Source of milk: Cows

Dambalkhacho (Georgian: დამბალხაჭო, romanized: dambalkhach'o) is a pungent Georgian cheese. The dried lumps are placed into clay pots and left that way for 2-3 months, in order for the cheese to develop special mold. The cheese has a specific, intense aroma, the texture is semi-soft and uniform, while the flavors are spicy.

== History ==
Dambalkhacho is made from sour buttermilk cottage cheese, traditionally produced in the mountainous Tianeti and Pshavi regions. The process involves salting and shaping the curds into balls, drying them over a fire, and then aging them for months in sealed clay pots, which allows mold to develop and creates a strong flavor and semi-soft, crumbly texture. Dambalkhacho with its distinctive textures, is a low fat, high protein cheese. Dambalkhacho pairs well with Georgian Rkatsiteli wine.

Dambalkhacho cheese was awarded national landmark status in Georgia.

== See also ==
- Sulguni
