= Ossetian cheese =

Type of cheese common in the North Caucasus

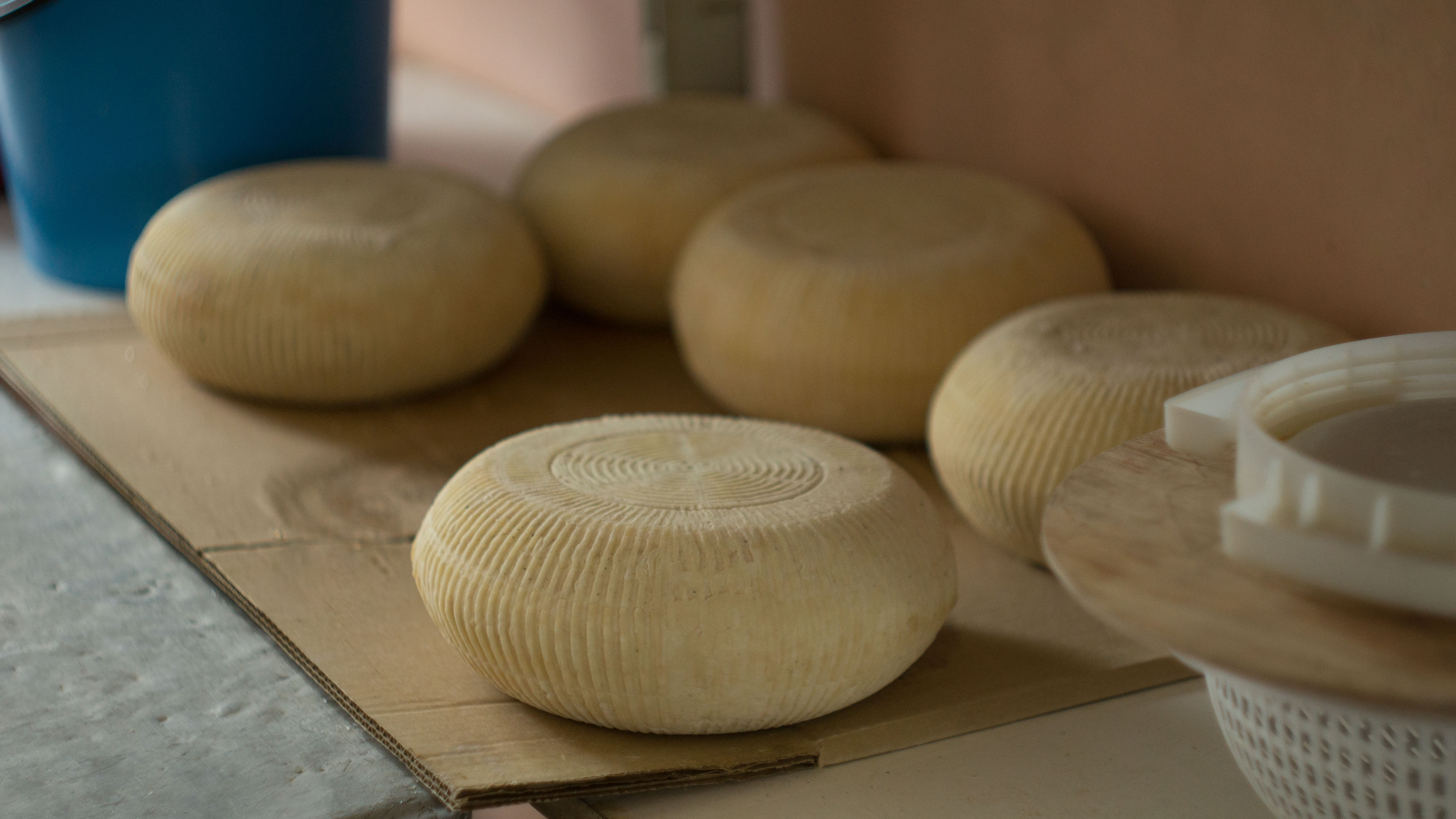
- Country of origin: Russia
- Region: North Caucasus
- Source of milk: Cow, sheep or goat milk
- Pasteurised: Depends on variety
- Texture: Depends on variety

Ossetian cheese (Ossetian: ирон цыхт / цигъд, romanized: iron cyxt / cihd) is a traditional cheese of the national Ossetian cuisine. It is prepared from sheep, goat or whole cow's milk.

== Production ==
To fresh warm milk in an enameled bucket or deep pot is added whey (Ossetian: сылы / сулу, romanized: syly / sulu, from which the old name of cheese is Ossetian: сылыджын / сулугун, romanized: sylydžyn / sulugun, literally translated as "made in whey"), infused with the source of enzymes - pieces of cleaned and salted cow's stomach (rennet). The milk is stirred and left in a warm place for 40–60 minutes, while controlling the curdling process of the milk to prevent over-fermentation. The curdled milk is stirred, then squeezed from the whey and placed in a mold.

== Interesting facts ==
Cheese was one of the main foodstuffs of the ancestors of the Ossetians (Alans) in the conditions of mountain farming. Cheese had a characteristic flavor and could be stored for a long time.
