= Lobio =

Traditional Georgian stew

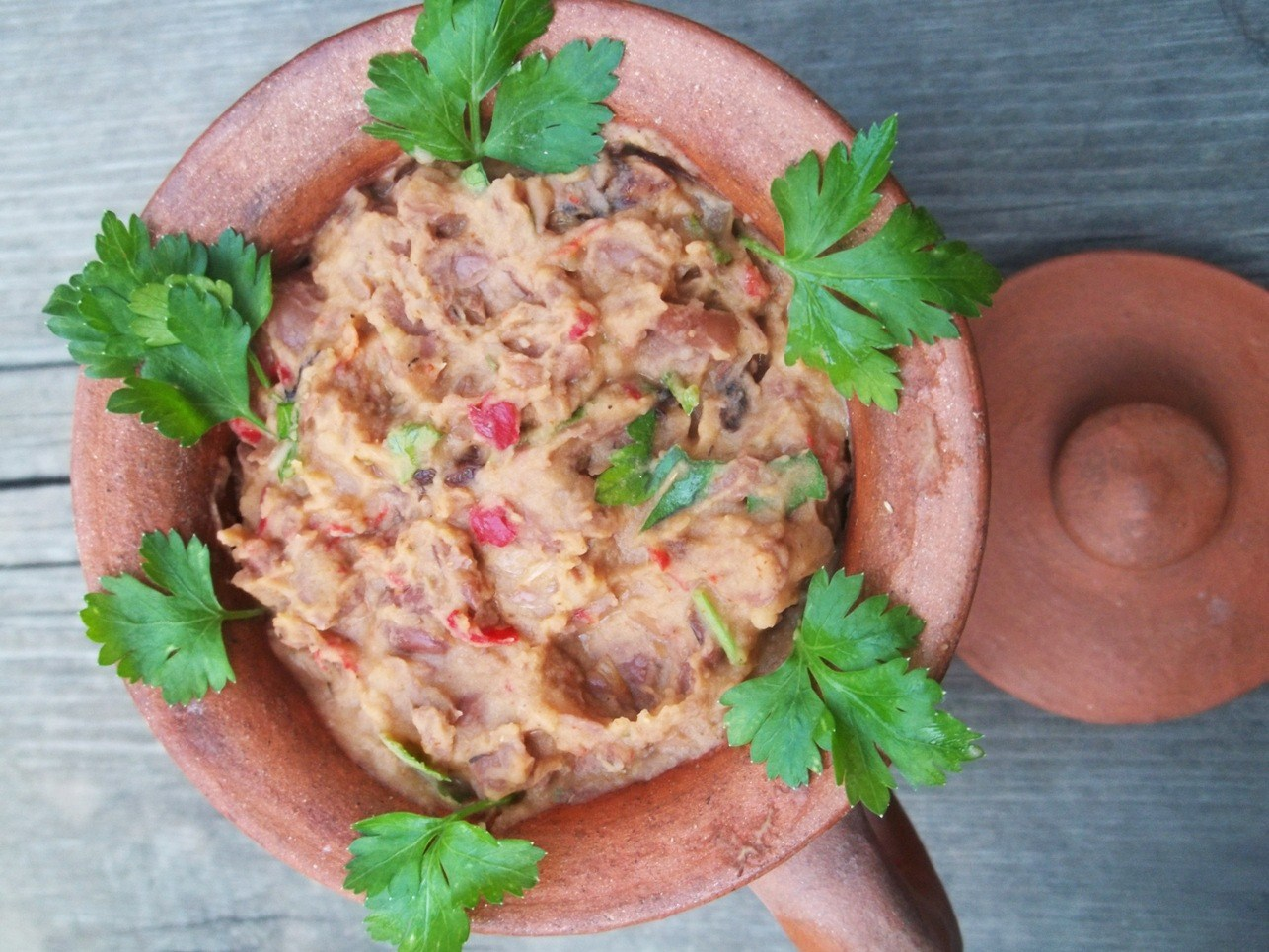
- Lobio with summer savory and ajika
- Type: Stew
- Place of origin: Georgia
- Main ingredients: Beans (cooked or stewed), onions, garlic, laurus leaf, chili pepper, coriander, satureja, fenugreek, walnuts

Lobio (Georgian: ლობიო) is a traditional Georgian dish of various kinds of prepared beans (cooked or stewed), also containing coriander, walnuts, garlic and onion. There are many varieties of lobio, both hot and cold.

== History ==
It is said to have originated in Georgia. While the dish may predate any division of the lands into countries, the most popular variant today uses red kidney beans, which are native to the Americas and introduced into Georgia after 1500. As with many Georgian dishes, lobio is spicy, but not necessarily hot. One of the traditional recipes for lobio does not call for hot peppers (as other recipes do) but relies solely on ground black pepper for its spice.

== Preparation and ingredients ==
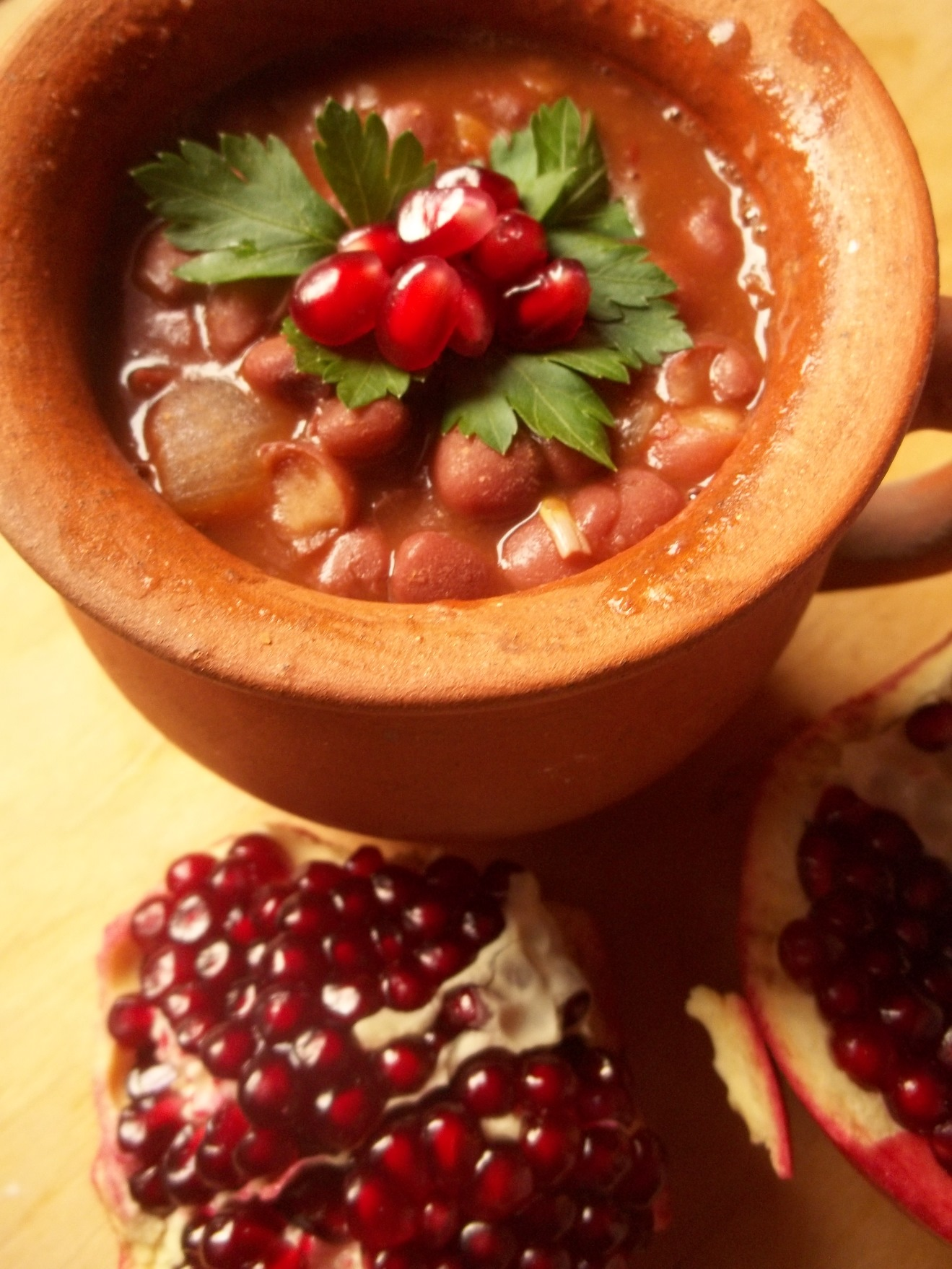
Lobio with pomegranate juice

While there are many ways of making lobio, the most common is a cold dish called lobio nigozit, typically made with dark red kidney beans which are cooked and then mashed with garlic, onions, walnuts, coriander, marigold petals, chili pepper and vinegar, and then allowed to marinate overnight. A hot version is usually made with white beans.

Some hot varieties of lobio may also contain meat. Beans would be put in the pot with water and spices and allowed to sit overnight. The following day, the pot would be placed over a fire or, if available, in a small exposed oven, and the beans slowly cooked. The cooked lobio would then be served in the clay pot, accompanied with mchadi (Georgian cornbread) and an assortment of pickled vegetables such as cabbage or cucumber.

Lobio, in its traditional form, has progressed to become a standard recipe, the ingredients of which vary by region.

== See also ==
- List of legume dishes
- List of stews
