= Ossetian cuisine =

Cooking styles and dishes of the Ossetian people

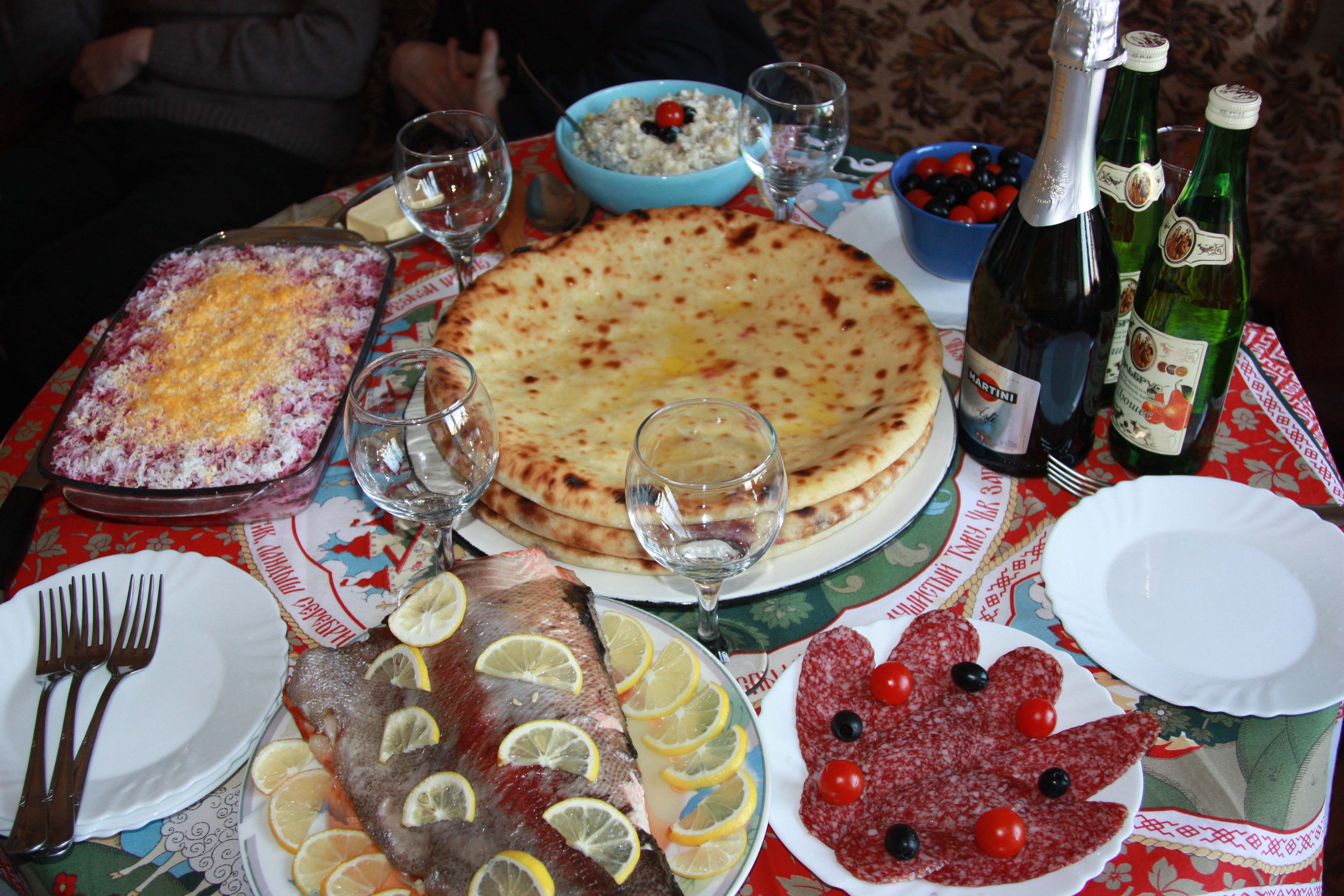
Ossetian pies, among a variety of other dishes

Ossetian cuisine (Iron Ossetic: Ирон хæринæгтæ, romanized: Iron xærinægtæ) refers to the cooking styles and dishes of the Ossetians of the Caucasus.

== Ossetian pie ==
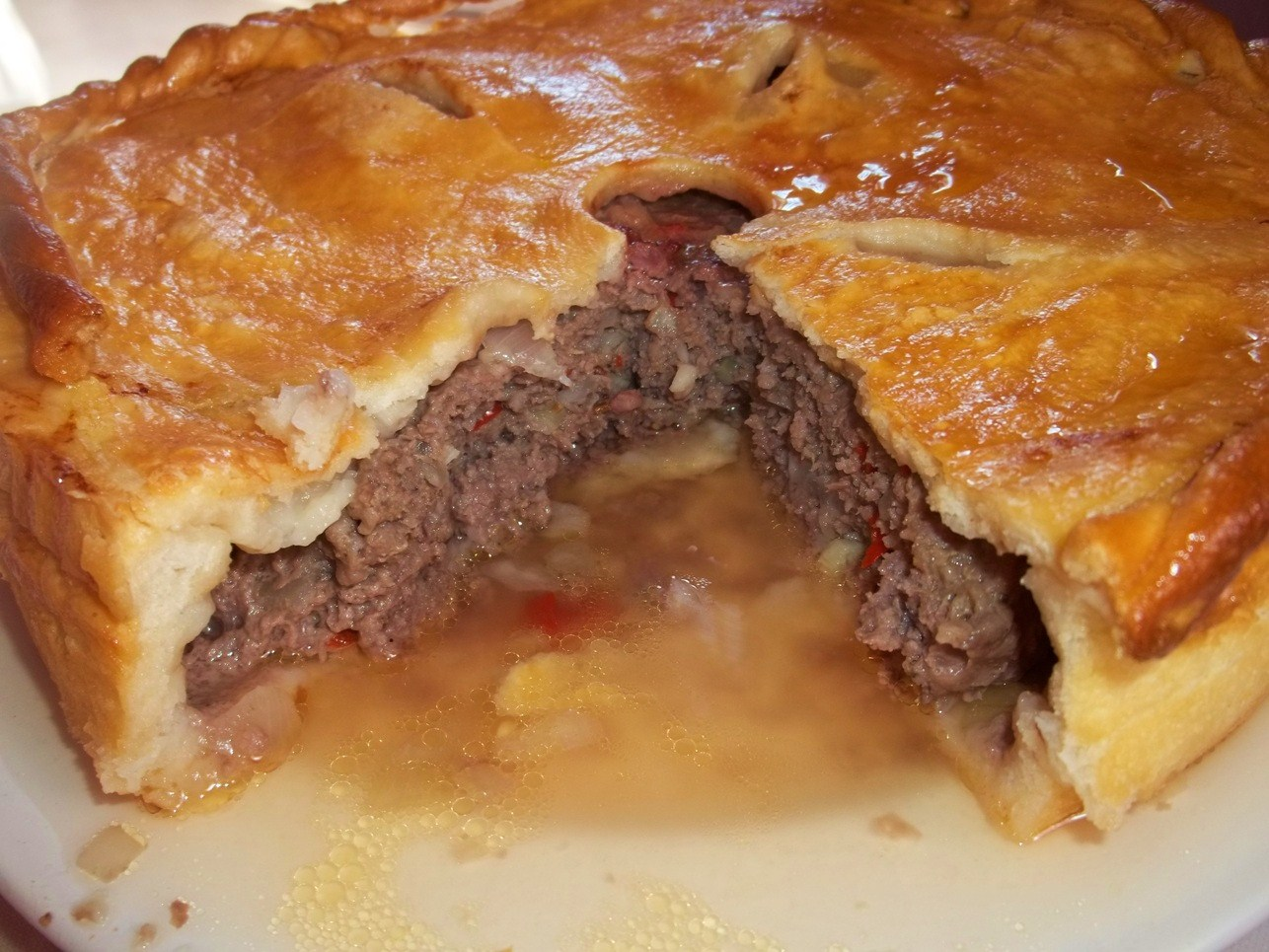
Sliced fidgin

Fidgin/fуddžyn (Iron Ossetic: фыдджын) is a type of meat pie.

Three pies (Iron Ossetic: Æртæ чъирийы) is an important concept in Ossetian culture, representing sun, earth and water.

== Ossetian beer ==
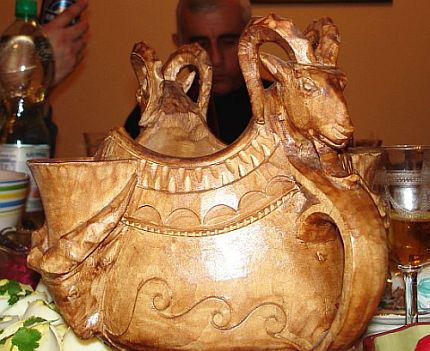
A traditional cup of Ossetian beer

Beer has been prepared and enjoyed in Ossetia since ancient times. Ossetian beer is dark-brown to black in color, has little-to-no foam and a significantly lower alcohol content than most ordinary types of beer. Iron Bægæny is a famous beer festival celebrating this cultural treasure in a manner comparable to that of the German Oktoberfest.

== Ossetian cheese ==
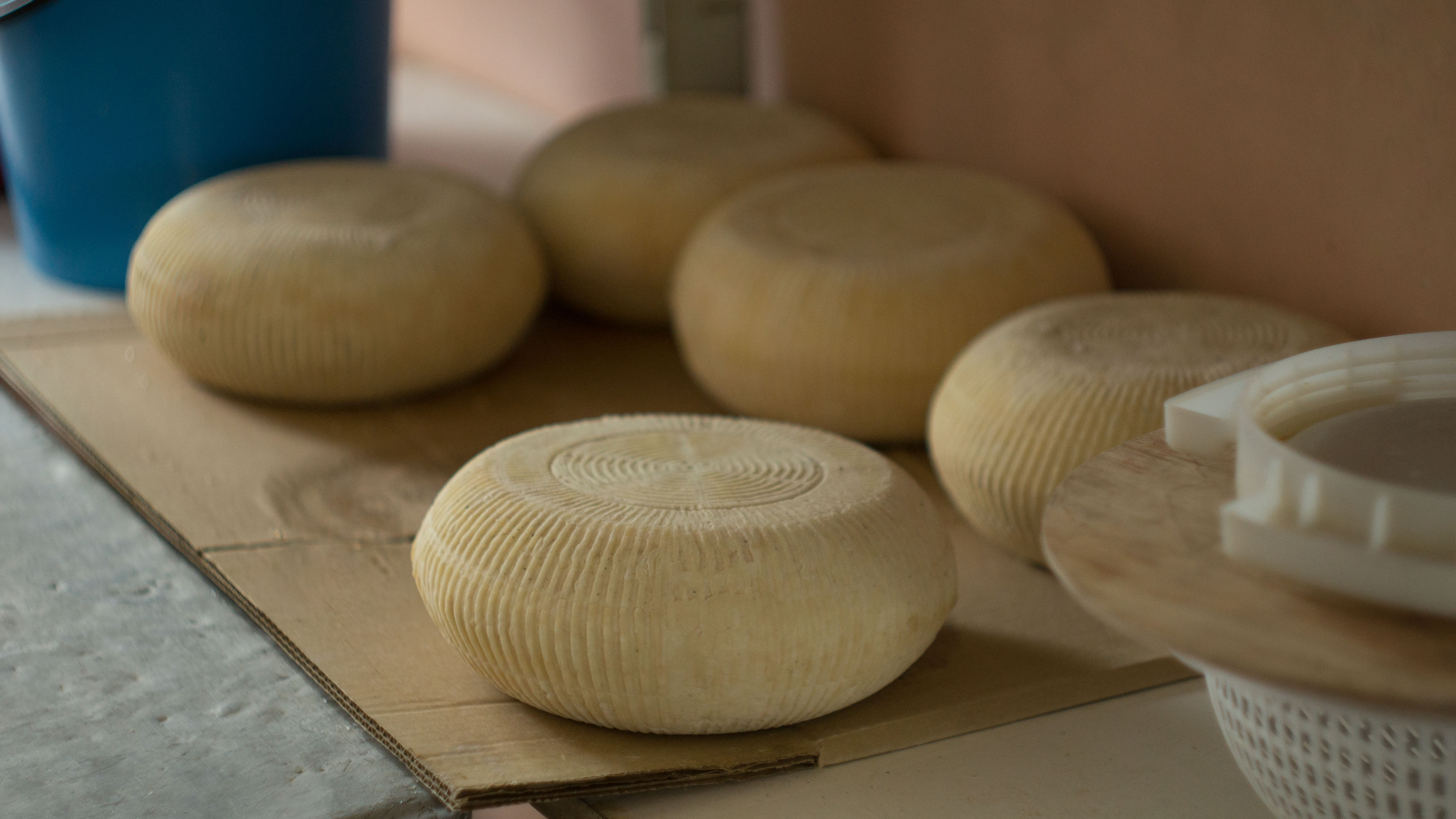
Ossetian cheese

Ossetian cheese is the traditional cheese of Ossetians. It is mostly served as hard cheese.

== South Ossetian dishes ==
A dish unique to South Ossetia—similar to a Scotch egg or nargesi kebab—is made by wrapping one half of a boiled egg in a serving of ground beef and frying it in tomato sauce.
