= Khachapuri =

Georgian cheese-filled bread

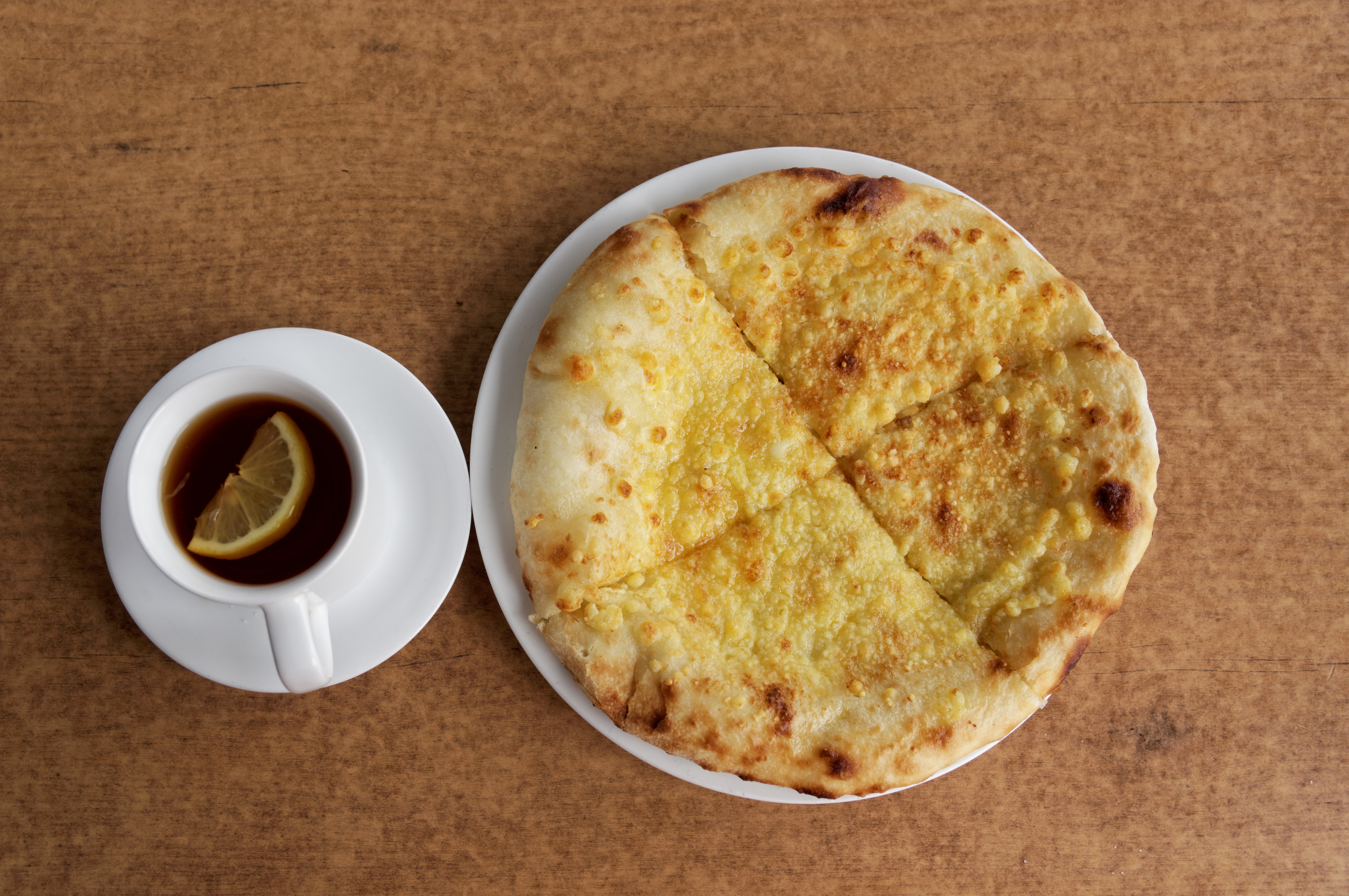
- Imeretian khachapuri, the most typical style of this dish among its many regional varieties
- Type: Flatbread
- Course: Pastry / filled pastry
- Place of origin: Georgia
- Serving temperature: hot
- Main ingredients: Cheese, eggs, flour
- Variations: Closed (most common) or open

Khachapuri (Note: Alternative spelling of the dish may also be Hachapuri. The name derives from ხაჭო khachʼo [ˈχat͡ʃʼo] 'curd' + პური pʼuri [ˈpʼuri] 'bread'.) (Georgian: ხაჭაპური, romanized: khach'ap'uri; [ˈχatʃʼapʼuɾi]) is a Georgian dish of cheese-filled bread. The bread is leavened and allowed to rise, molded into various shapes, and then filled in the center with a mixture of cheese, and sometimes eggs or other ingredients.

It is popular in Georgia, both in restaurants and as street food. As a Georgian staple food, the price of making khachapuri is used as a measure of inflation in different Georgian cities by the "khachapuri index", developed by the International School of Economics at Tbilisi State University.

It is Georgia's national dish, and the item "The Khachapuri Tradition in Georgia" was included in the list of Intangible Cultural Heritage elements in Georgia on January 22, 2019.

Georgia celebrates "National Khachapuri Day" yearly on February 27.

== History ==
Specialists are divided regarding the chronology of khachapuri. According to Darra Goldstein, who wrote the book The Georgian Feast about the dish, khachapuri probably dates back to the 12th century when Georgia experienced a period of renaissance, but its specific root remains unclear. Dali Tsatava, former professor at the Georgian Culinary Academy, suggested that khachapuri could be a "cousin of the pizza" as the concept of the dish might have been brought by Roman soldiers who crossed Europe, well before the addition of tomatoes in the 16th century.

== Types ==
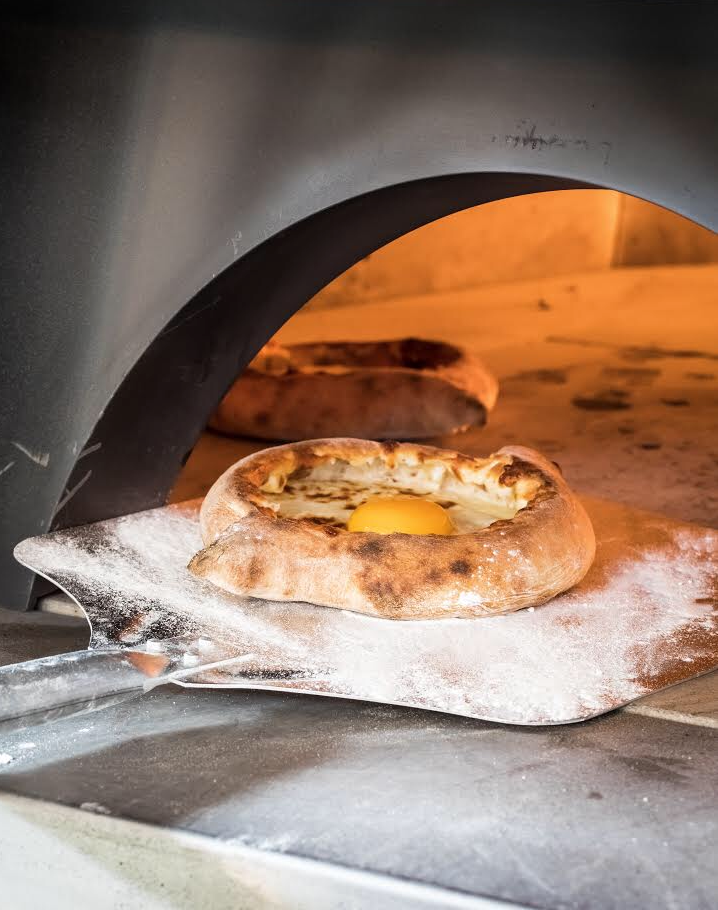
Adjarian khachapuri with cheese, butter and egg yolk

There are several distinctive types of khachapuri from different regions of Georgia:

- Imeretian (Imeruli) khachapuri is the most popular form, made with a yeast dough filled with white Imeretian salted cheese.
- Adjarian (Acharuli/Adjaruli), originating from Adjara, is a boat-shaped khachapuri, with cheese, butter, and an egg yolk in the middle. Traditionally, tangy imeruli and sulguni cheeses are used. Given Adjara's location on the Black Sea, it is said to be a representation of a boat, the sea, and the sun.
- Megrelian khachapuri (Megruli) is similar to Imeretian, but has more cheese added on top.
- Achma, from Abkhazia, has multiple layers and resembles a sauceless lasagna.
- Gurian (Guruli) khachapuri has chopped boiled eggs inside and looks like a crescent-shaped calzone. In Guria, it is called "Christmas pie", as Gurians usually make and serve them during Christmastime. In the rest of Georgia, it is called "Gurian pie."
- Ossetian khachapuri/pie may have various fillings such as potato and cheese as its filling.
- Svanuri lemzira
- Rachuli khachapuri
- Samtskhe–Javakhetian penovani khachapuri is made with cheese-filled puff pastry dough, resulting in a flaky variety of the pie.

== Outside Georgia ==
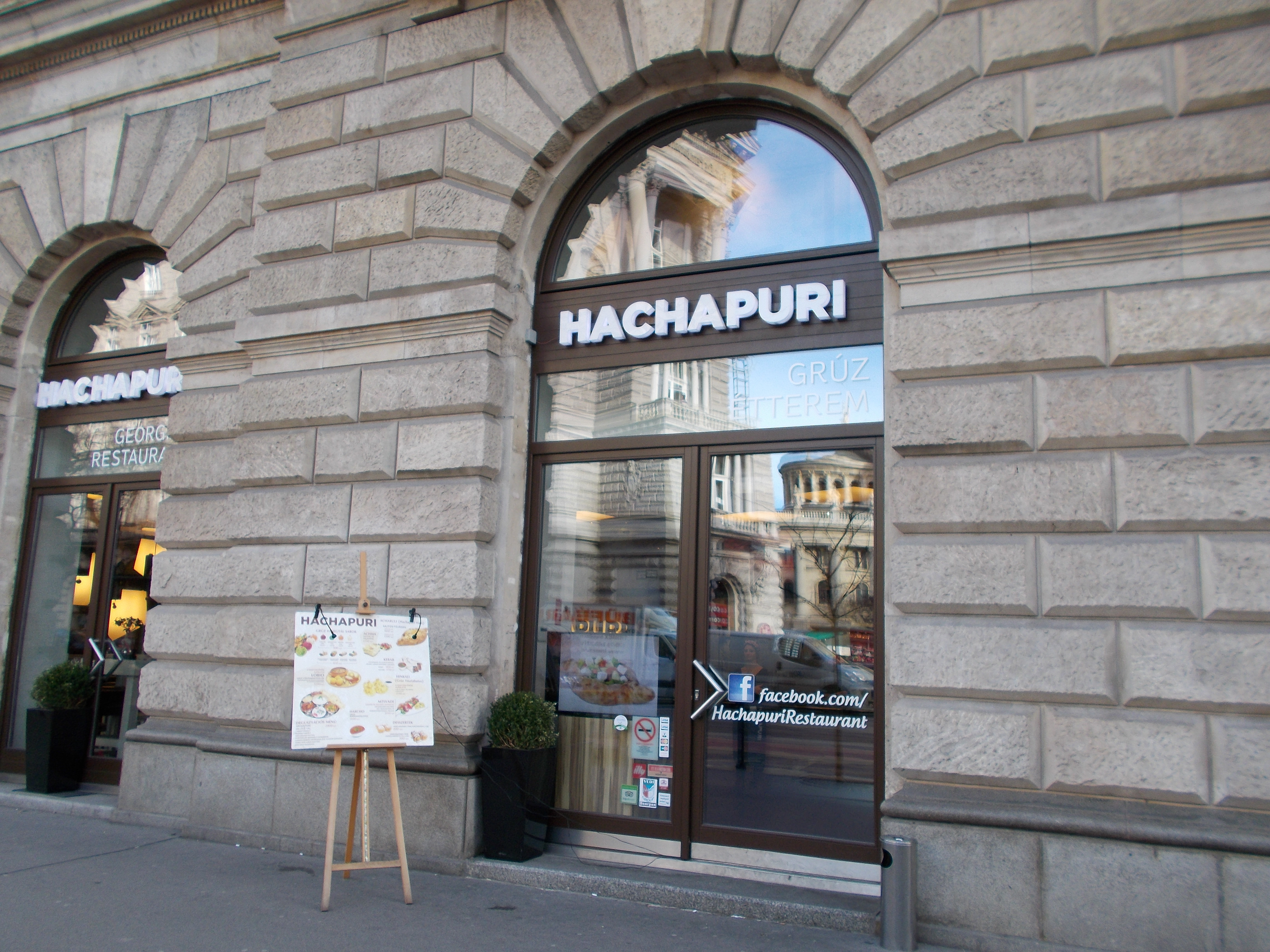
A Georgian restaurant, Hachapuri, in Budapest, Hungary

Khachapuri is popular in the post-Soviet states, including Russia. It was reported that 175,000 khachapuris were consumed during the 2014 Winter Olympics in Sochi. Khachapuri is a popular street food in Armenia, where it is widely served in restaurants and school cafeterias. It has become increasingly popular as a brunch food in Israel, where it was brought over by Georgian Jews and is spreading to other parts of the world, like the United States.

== See also ==
- Pizza
- Burek
