= Guda cheese =

Georgian cheese

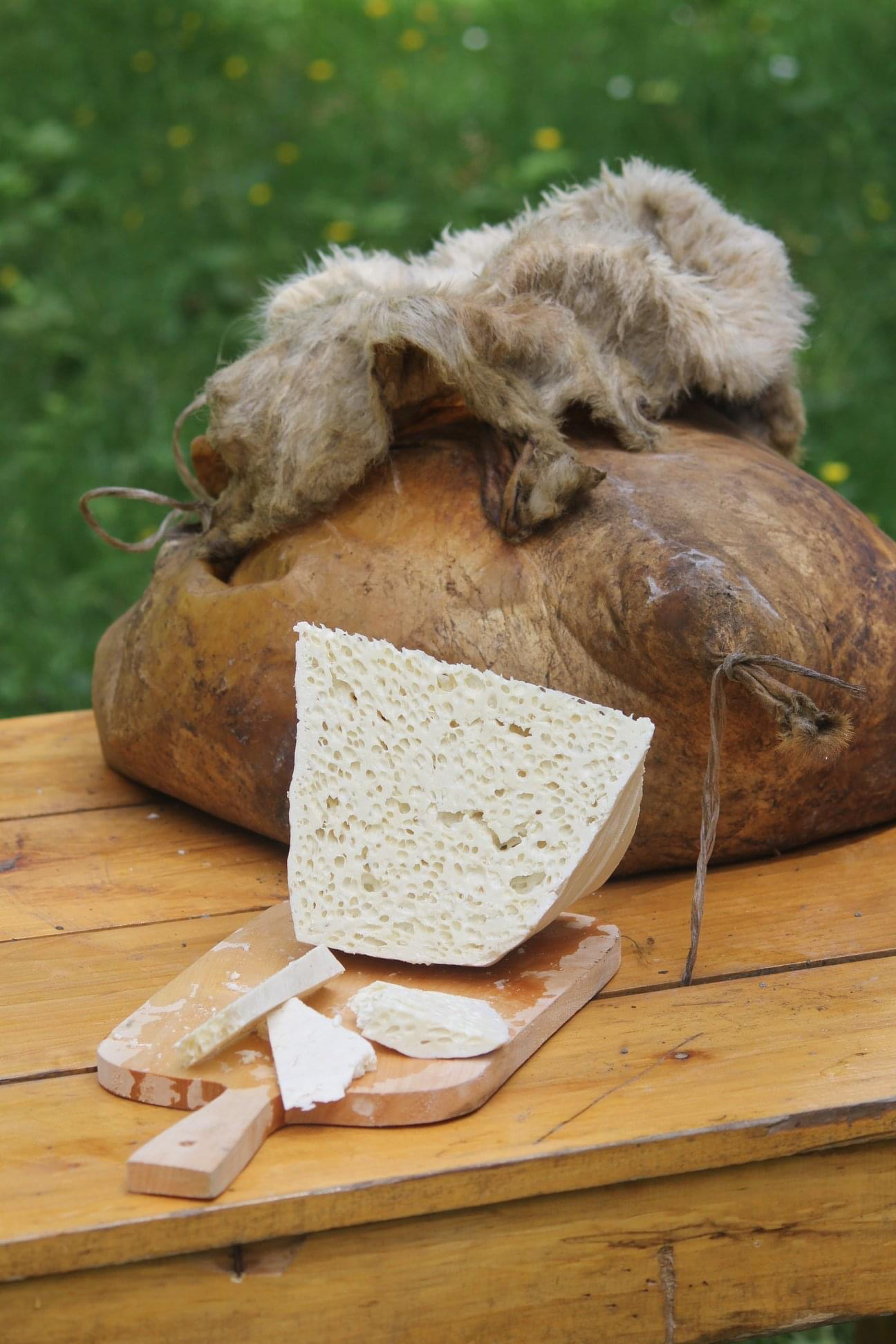
- Country of origin: Georgia
- Region: Tusheti
- Source of milk: Sheep

Guda cheese (Georgian: გუდის ყველი, romanized: gudis q'veli) is a Georgian cheese from the historical region of Tusheti.

== History ==
Guda cheese is produced in the mountain villages of Tusheti. Its production method is similar to that of Imeretian cheese, but sheep's milk is used. The defining feature of the production process is the cheese's maturation inside a leather wineskin, hence the name: Guda, i.e. "cheese from a bag."

For this purpose, a wineskin is crafted from the inverted hide of a young sheep, from which all the wool has been shaved. Before the production process begins, the milk is strained through a sieve lined with herbs; rennet is then added to curdle the milk, and the vessel is covered with a felt blanket or a traditional felt cloak for one hour to retain heat. Subsequently, the curdled milk is stirred and covered again for another half-hour. Afterward, the whey is drained off, and the cut curds are placed into a linen bag; the remaining whey is squeezed out of the cheese mass, thereby shaping it into the future cheese wheel. The cheese wheels, still inside their linen bags, are laid out on a board and covered once more for two hours. Excess liquid drains away through the fibers of the bags, causing the cheese mass to become drier. After two hours have elapsed, the wheels are removed from the bags and packed into the prepared wineskin, with layers of salt sprinkled between them. Any excess air is expelled from the wineskin, which is then tied shut and covered with felt for two days. For the first few days, the wineskin is turned over three times daily to ensure the salt is distributed evenly. In the final stage of production, the cheese is left to ripen for up to or around 60 days.

== See also ==
- Dambalkhacho
- Sulguni
