= Sulguni =

Brined Georgian cheese from the Samegrelo region

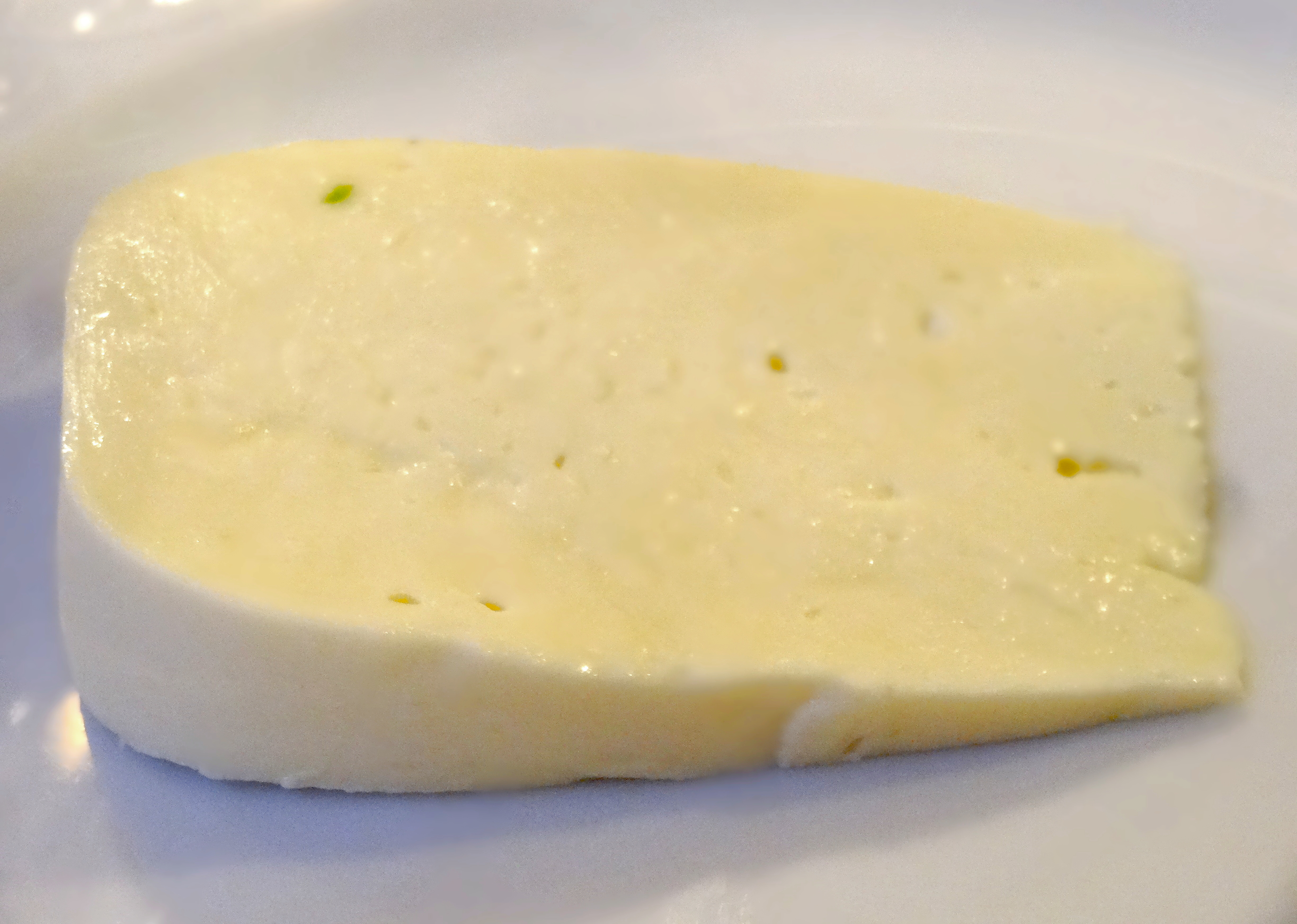
- Other names: Suluguni
- Country of origin: Georgia
- Region: Samegrelo-Zemo Svaneti
- Source of milk: Cows, buffalos

Sulguni (Georgian: სულგუნი, სულუგუნი sulguni, suluguni; Mingrelian: სელეგინი selegini) is a brined Georgian cheese from the Samegrelo region. It has a sour, moderately salty flavor, a dimpled texture, and an elastic consistency; these attributes are the result of the process used, as is the source of its nickname "pickled cheese". Its color ranges from white to pale yellow. Suluguni is often deep-fried, which masks its odor. It is often served in wedges. Suluguni has been protected as a geographical indication by Georgia since 24 January 2012.

A typical Suluguni cheese is shaped as a flat disc, 2.5 to 3.5 centimeters thick. It weighs 0.5 to 1.5 kg (1.1 to 3.3 lb) and contains 50% water and between 1% and 5% salt. Dry fat content averages 45%. Suluguni is produced only of natural ingredients: normalized cow milk by clotting by rennet with pure cultures of lactic bacteria.

== Etymology ==
The name is etymologized as Mingrelian: სელეგინი (selegini).

A folk etymology posits that the name Suluguni comes from two Georgian words: suli (which means "soul") and guli ("heart").

According to an alternative theory, the word is etymologized as Ossetic (Digor dialect) сулугун (sulugun) adding Georgian nominative formant i, where sulu means whey, and -gun means "made of". However, this version does not take into account the fact that initially this cheese was produced in Samegrelo region in the western Georgia, which doesn't border to other regions of Georgia where partially Ossetian language is used. At the same time, initially in Megrelian language the name sounds as selegin (sele - verb. "to knead", gin - cattle family (buffalos, cows) whose milk is used to produce the cheese). Kneading of the primary cheese is the key stage of the final cheese production process. These arguments contradict the etymologization on the basis of Ossetian sulu. It is assumed that selegin was transformed into suluguni as a result of migration of the name into Georgian and to Eastern and other regions of Georgia.

== Production ==
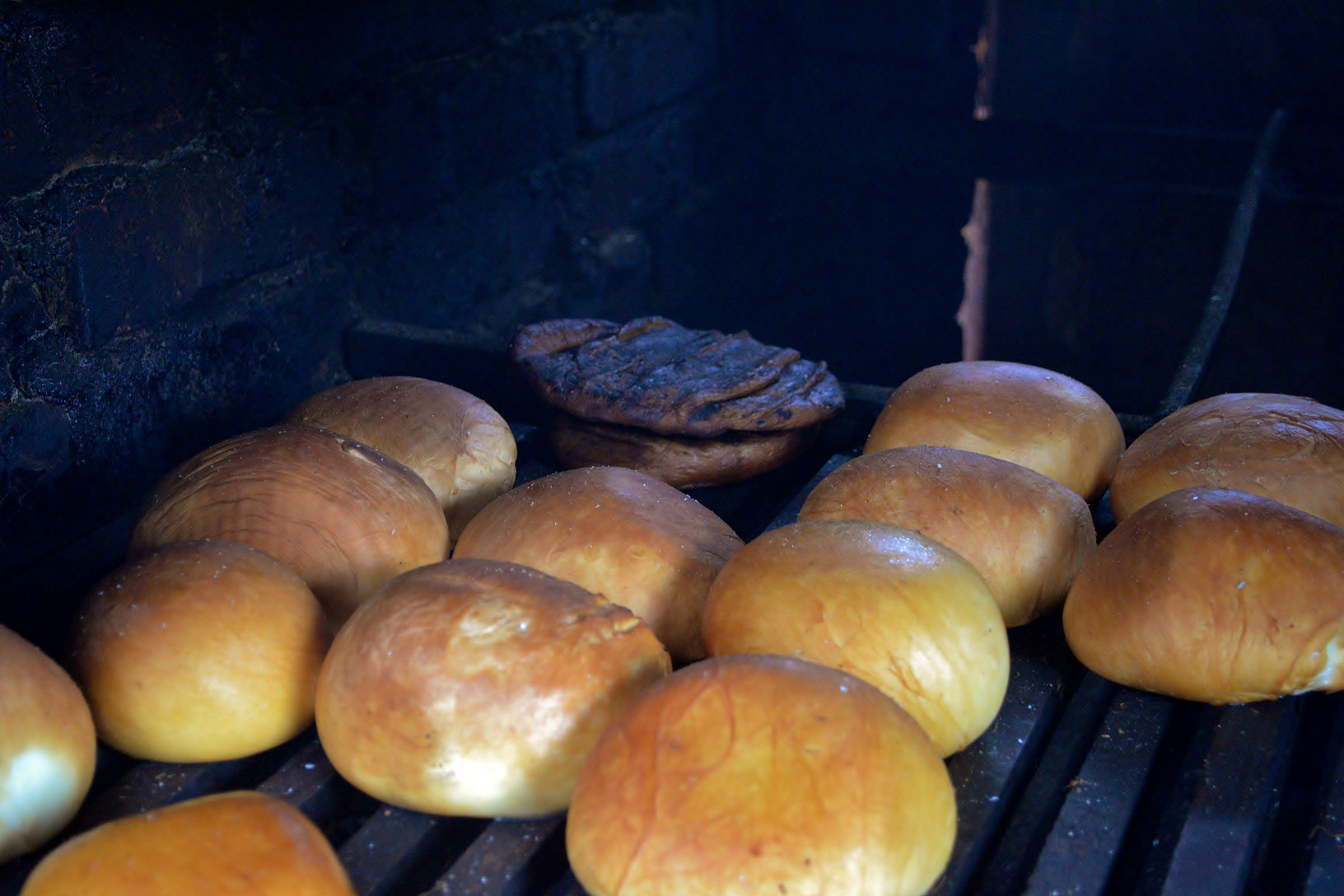
Suluguni being smoked

According to the 1970s sources, Suluguni accounted for around 27% of cheese production in Georgia. It was the third most popular pickled cheese of the Soviet Union, with 16.5% share in 1987 (after bryndza and Ossetian cheese).

Suluguni may be produced from normalized milk of cow, buffalo, or a mix of these milks. It is a "quick cheese" maturing in just one or two days. The mix of normalized milk and bacterial starter is scalded at 36-38 °C or, alternatively, renneted without scalding. It is then cheddared in whey at 34-35 °C for up to five hours, reaching titratable acidity of 140-160°C.

The cheddared mass is then diced into pieces 1 to 3 centimeters long. They are heated to 60-80 °C in a rotating mixer, either directly or with added whey or brine. Plasticizing of raw mass takes five to seven minutes. Direct dry plasticizing yields fatter, drier cheese with superior taste. Plasticized cheese mass is then cooled, drained of whey and shaped by hand. Shaped cheeses are cured in cold (8-12 °C), mildly acidic brine for 6 to 48 hours.

For a long time, Suluguni rennet cheese was produced only by local Georgian farmers but in 2012 the Georgian dairy company "LTD Sante GMT products" started producing packaged Suluguni. They are utilizing a fully automated production process, with minimized manual operations.

In Russia, suluguni cheese is produced by technology described in GOST R 53437-2009 "Suluguni and Sloistyi cheeses. Specifications". Word "sloistyi" (Russian: слоистый) means "layered"; this name (layered cheese) is being used sometimes in the USSR and disused in current Russian language.

== See also ==
- List of cheeses
- List of stretch-curd cheeses – Cheeses prepared using the pasta filata technique
