= List of Armenian sweets and desserts =

This is a list of desserts from Armenian cuisine.

Most of the following desserts are either nut and fruit-based desserts, sweet breads, cakes, pastries, confections, cookies, puddings, or preserves.

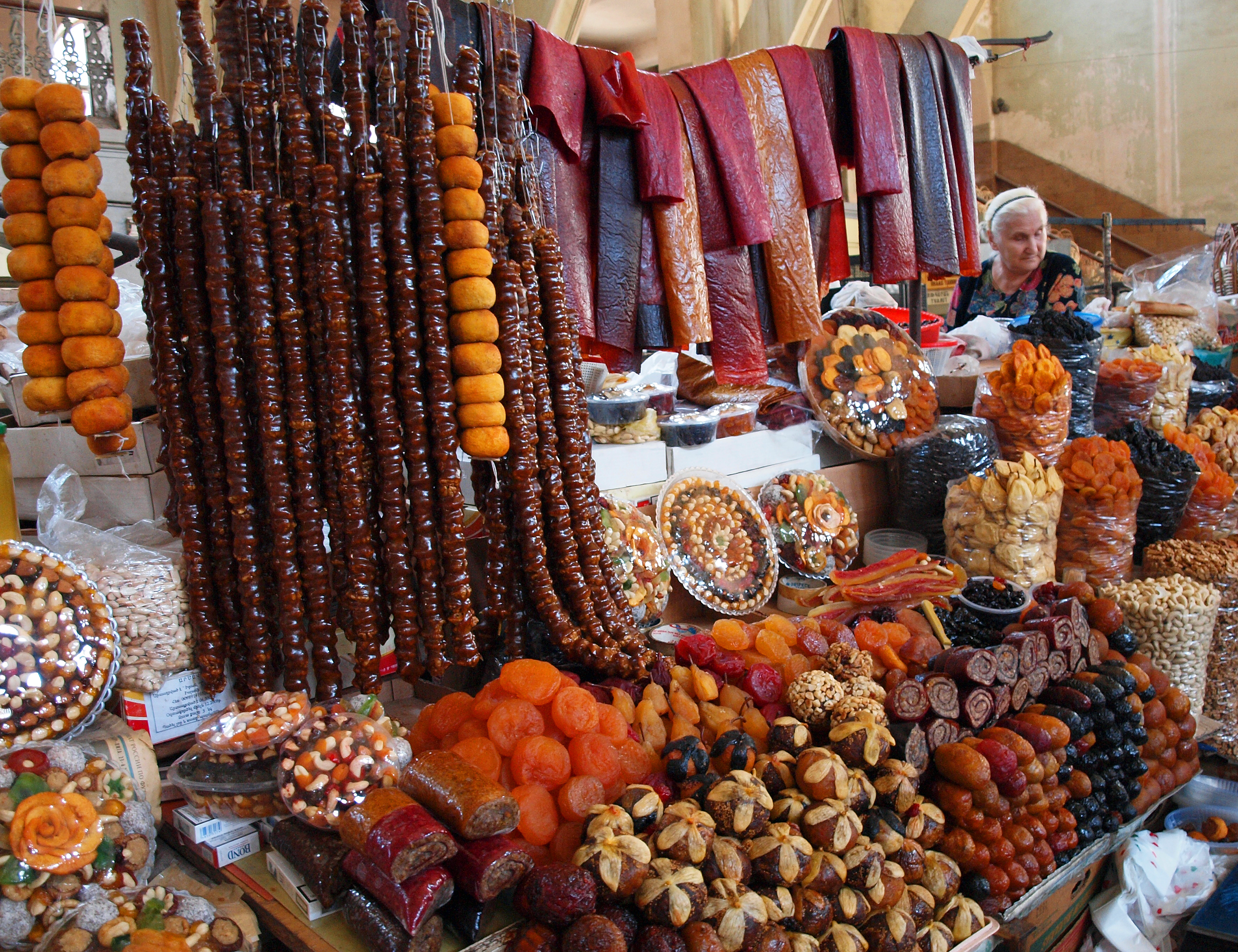

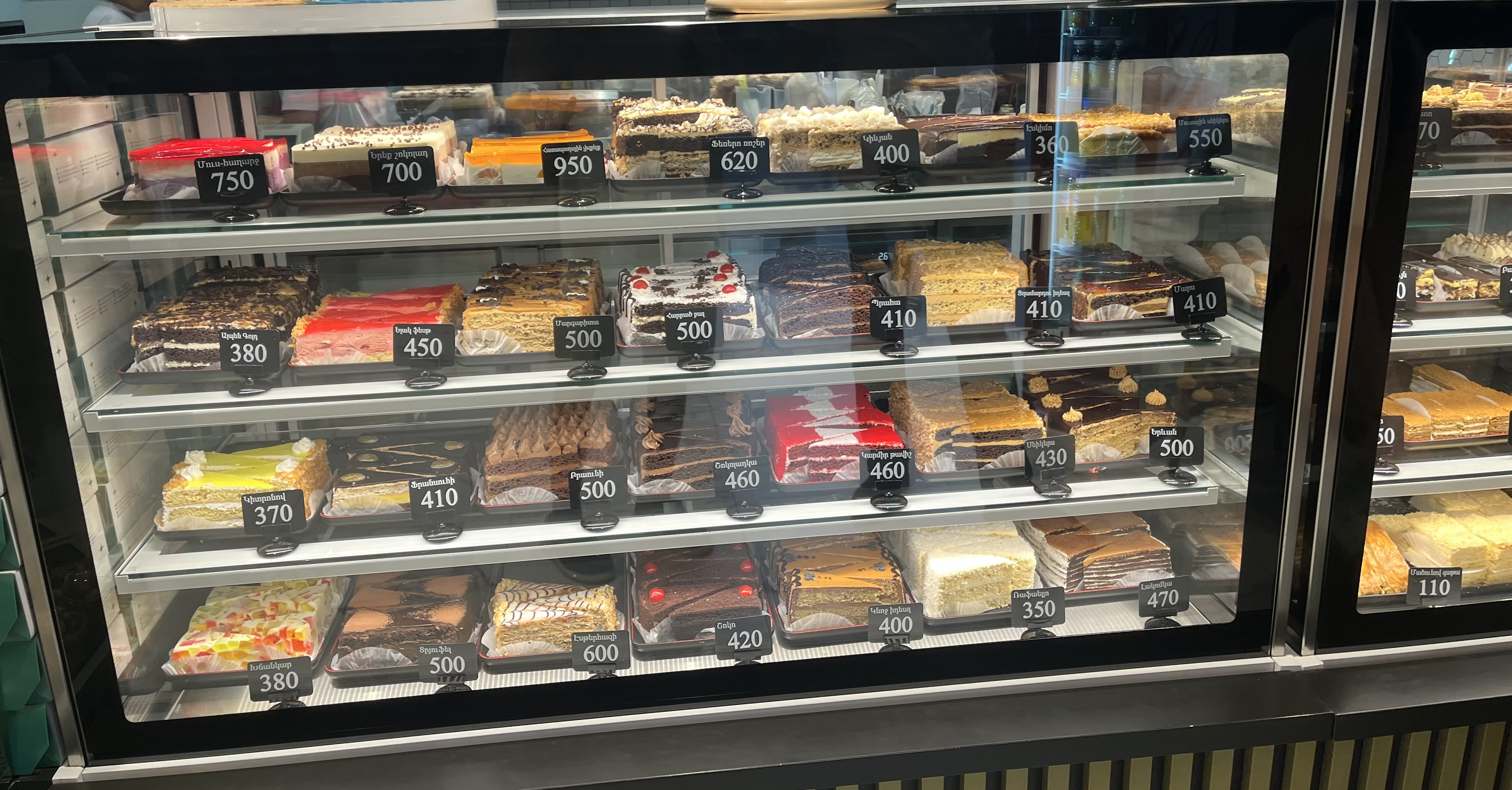

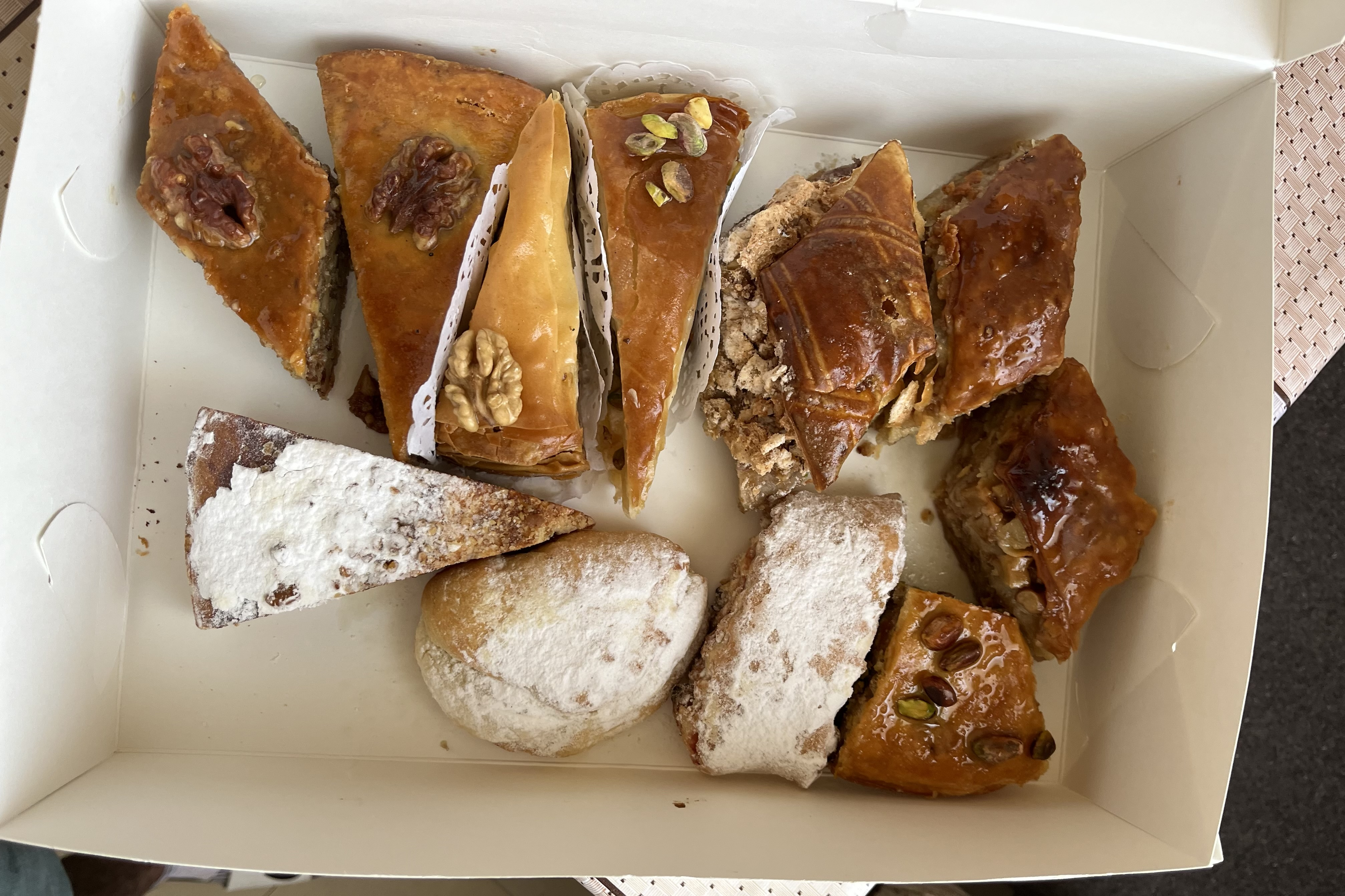

== List ==
Name of dessert	Image	Type	Description
Mikado		Cake	Layered Cake made by layering dough with either sweetened condensed milk, caramel cream, or buttercream, when finished it is covered in chopped chocolate pieces.
Gata		Sweet bread	Sweet bread primarily filled with khoritz (butter, sugar, flour), nuts and fruits. Vanadzor, Stepanavan, Gavar, Gyumri and Yerevan varieties exist within Armenia.
Alani		Confection	Dried fruits, like peaches, apricots, or walnut stuffed figs) with a mixture of nuts and melted sugar, or honey inside.
Yughatert		Cake	Layered cake made from thin layers of dough, butter and honey. The dough is mixed with eggs, milk, baking soda, and butter, then rolled, brushed with butter and honey, folded six times, and baked. After baking, it is cut into squares and drizzled with warm honey butter.
Sharots		Confection	Traditional confection made from halved walnut kernels threaded onto a string and coated with a spiced grape, pomegranade, cherry, plum, peach, mulberry, apple, cinnamon, or another fruit/spice-based mixture, of which all are a type of doshab.
Pastegh		Confection	Fruit leather made with dried out fruit pulp.
Nazook		Pastry	Rolled pastries traditionally made by rolling a dough that has a mixture of khoritz (butter, sugar and flour), and oftentimes fruits, or/and nuts spread on top of it before rolling. When baked, It is sometimes powdered with powdered sugar.
Pakhlava		Pastry	Pastry prepared by layering dough with butter and nuts before baking it and soaking it in syrup, Armenia has a unique variety made in Gavar.
Fruchella		Confection	Round balls of fruit doshab (same mixture as used in sharots) filled with sweetened nuts.
Cigarette cookies		Cookies	Soft cookies shaped as a cigarette, usually with the filling of lokum and/or spiced nuts.
Nshablit		Cookies	Armenian almond cookies.
Tutalik or Ponchik		Pastry	Puffy dough that is filled with either classic custard, caramel custard, chocolate custard, and nutella. After being fried it puffs up, but deflates when opened, or bitten into. Often covered in powdered sugar.
Bagharj		Sweet bread	Sweet bread with decorated edges and top.
Barurik		Pastry	Soft dough roll filled with cinnamon, chopped walnuts and sugar, rolled into the spiral before being baked.
Pastegh Rolls		Confection	Ttu Lavash rolls either eaten plain, or filled with nuts.
Shpot		Pudding	Traditional dish consisting of a thick, porridge-like mass primarily made from fruit must.
Shakarats		Cookie	Armenian sugar cookies.
Anoushabur		Pudding	Sweet porrdige eaten at special occasions like Christmas and New Year’s to celebrate and give thanks, recalling Noah’s feast after the flood. It consists of wheat or barley, dried fruits, nuts, sugar, spices, and rose water.
Katnashorov		Pastry	Soft pastry filled with sweetened quark, often a fruit-infused quark. It is made from dough of flour, yeast, milk, sugar, eggs, and butter, then baked and dusted with powdered sugar.
Khavitz		Pudding	Sweet porridge made from toasted wheat flour cooked with butter, milk, and honey or sugar, sometimes flavored with cinnamon.
Popok		Confection	Walnut-shaped confection made with pancake-like dough and filled with caramel cream.
Mrjnabuyn		Confection	Confection made from crushed nuts and dough crumbs bound togheter by sweetened condensed milk in the form of an ants nest and covered in chocolate.
Marlenka		Cake	Honey cake made from multiple honey-sweetened cake layers with a filling of caramel cream, or sweetened buttercream. It is sometimes partly-covered in chocolate icing or Its cream and a topping of leftover dough crumbles and nuts. It is similar to Medovik in many ways, a cake that is also popular in Armenia.
Murabba		Preserve	Sweet fruit preserve made from multiple fruits and nuts.
Tahini rolls		Sweet bread	Sweet bread made with a soft dough and a filling of tahini, sugar and cinnamon.
Tghmardu Ideal		Cake	Layered cake made from soft biscuit layers with walnuts, filled and coated with a rich butter and condensed milk cream that often has brandy added to them. The layers are brushed with chocolate and the cake is finished with dark chocolate glaze, dark chocolate chunks and walnuts on top.
Halva		Confection	Sweet confection, or hardened paste made from either grains, nuts, or seeds, the chosen base is then combined with sugar syrup and made into a paste. In Armenia, halva made with pokhindz is especially popular.
Napoleon		Cake	Cake made with multiple layers of very thin dough, with the layers having a filling of sweet cream between them. It is often accompanied by, or even made with fruits and nuts like rapsberries, walnuts, or hazelnuts. One variation adds Armenian brandy to the cream.
Zadige Keghke		Cookies	Mostly braided, or s-shaped easter cookies made with a sweet dough and spices like mahleb, nutmeg, cloves and cinnamon. They are also often sprinkled with sesame, or caraway seeds.
Katnahunc		Sweet bread	Sweet easter bread made from a yeast dough of flour, sugar, milk, butter, eggs, citrus zest, and spices such as mahleb and cardamom, nutmeg, cinnamon and vanilla. The dough is kneaded, left to rise, and then shaped into braids, the form the braids are stretched into can either resemble a loaf, or a large doughnut-shape. It can be filled with dried fruits, nuts, or chocolate cream and other things. Before baking, the dough is often brushed with egg yolk and sprinkled with sesame.
Beeshee		Pastry	Dough pastry made with a pancake-like dough before being fried. When done it is sprinkled with powdered sugar, similar to a beignet.
Khourabia		Cookie	Butter cookie made with butter, sugar, flour, eggs, cinnamon, vanilla, finely chopped walnuts, and in some variations, armenian brandy. It is traditionally eaten during the easter, christmas and new years celebrations.
Banana cookies		Cookies	Soft cookies filled with a banana cream.
Dziranamahig		Cookies	Soft rolled crescent cookies made with an apricot murabba.
Trchni kat tort		Cake	Birds milk cake made with either multiple layers of soft dough and a birds milk cream, or with a dough base at the bottom and a birds milk cream main part. Both versions are covered in dark chocolate glaze.
Archuk		Cake	Layered cake made with layers of soft dough and cream that is covered in chocolate ganache.
Bkhbkhik		Pastry	Fried soft dough drizzled with either honey, or doshab and sometimes topped with chopped nuts as well. It is traditionally consumed during the bun barekendan holiday.
Shakarshee		Cookie	Cookie made from soft dough consisting of butter, powdered sugar, flour, eggs and finely ground walnuts. Some variations add a chocolate ganache topping. After being formed, a walnut half is placed on top of each before being baked. The texture is reported to be chewy and buttery.
Katnapour		Pudding	Armenian rice pudding flavored with cinnamon.
Armenian fruit cakes		Cake	Multiple cakes in Armenia are made using fruits, fruit murabba, and/or fruit-based creams. They are mostly layered. For example, Tsiranov tort, also known as Karakul, is made apricots, Moriov tort is made with raspberries, and Deghdzov tort is made with peaches.
Armenian nut and spice cakes		Cake	Multiple cakes in Armenia are made using nuts and spices. These are either part of the dough, making it a dough based cake, a part of the cream inside the cake, or/and also a garnish on top of the cake. One prime example of that would be Mshk’enkuyzov tort, also known as Armenian nutmeg cake consisting of two elements, first the crumble layer similar to streusel that is used the bottom base and also as garnish, made primarily with brown sugar, butter, as well as flour and second, the batter made of milk, eggs, and nutmeg primarily, while also including cinnamon and baking powder. After being baked it is topped with nutmeg and walnuts.

== See also ==
- Armenian cuisine
- List of desserts
