= Walnut sujuk =

West Asian walnut and grape must snack

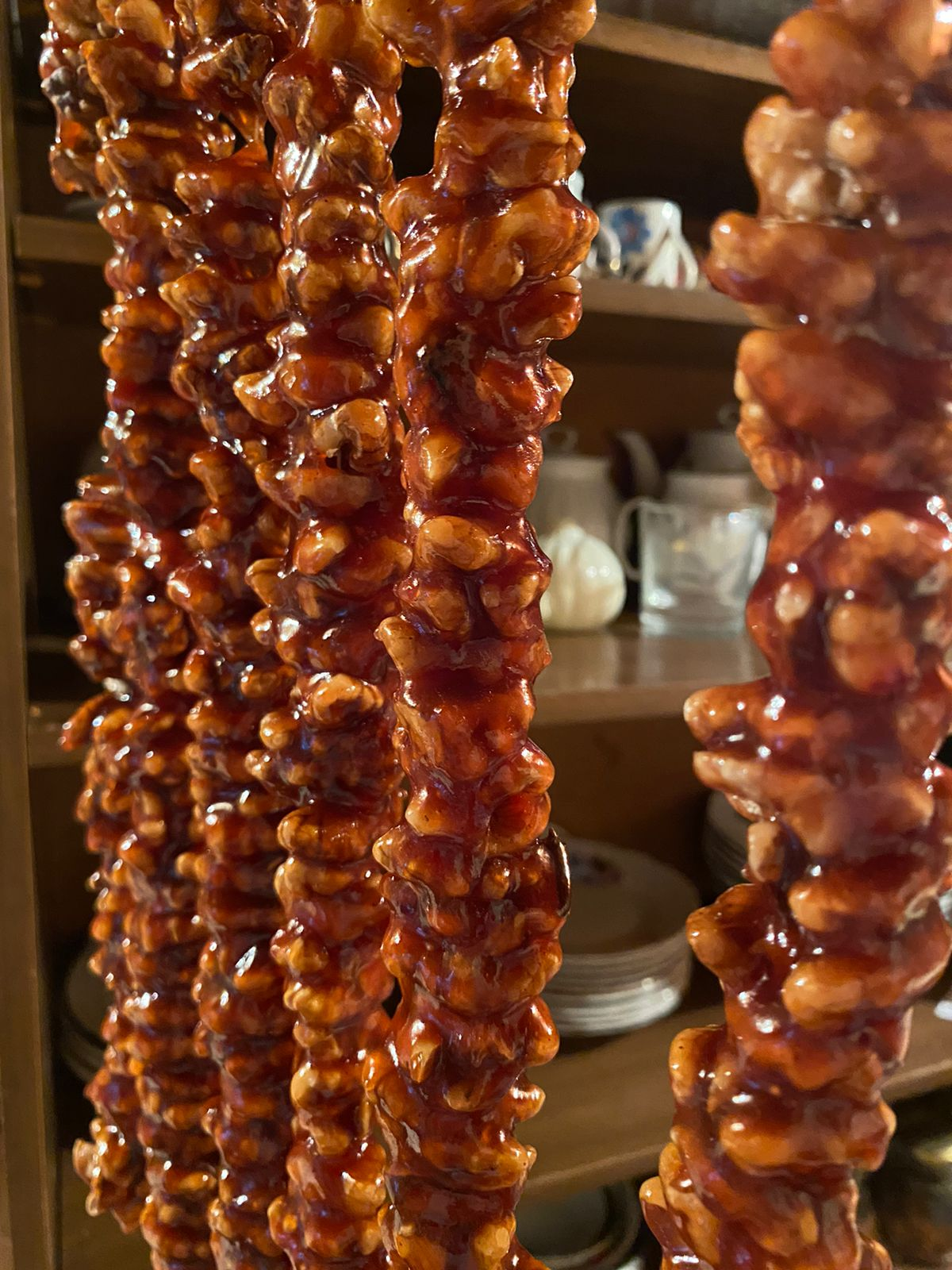
- Hanging grape must-based walnut sujuk up close
- Alternative names: Joq Malban; Sharots; Rojig; Churchkhela; Soutzoukos
- Type: Fruit preserves
- Course: Dessert
- Region or state: West Asia
- Serving temperature: Room temperature
- Main ingredients: Grape must, walnuts
- Variations: Sharots, Churchkhela

Walnut sujuk is a confection made from walnuts and grape must found in several West Asian cuisines. It is made running a string through a group of walnuts before covering them in grape must that is thickened by flour before leaving the confection to dry.

== Etymology ==
Sucuk in Turkish refers to a type of sausage, the name is derived from the shape of the confection.

== Preparation ==
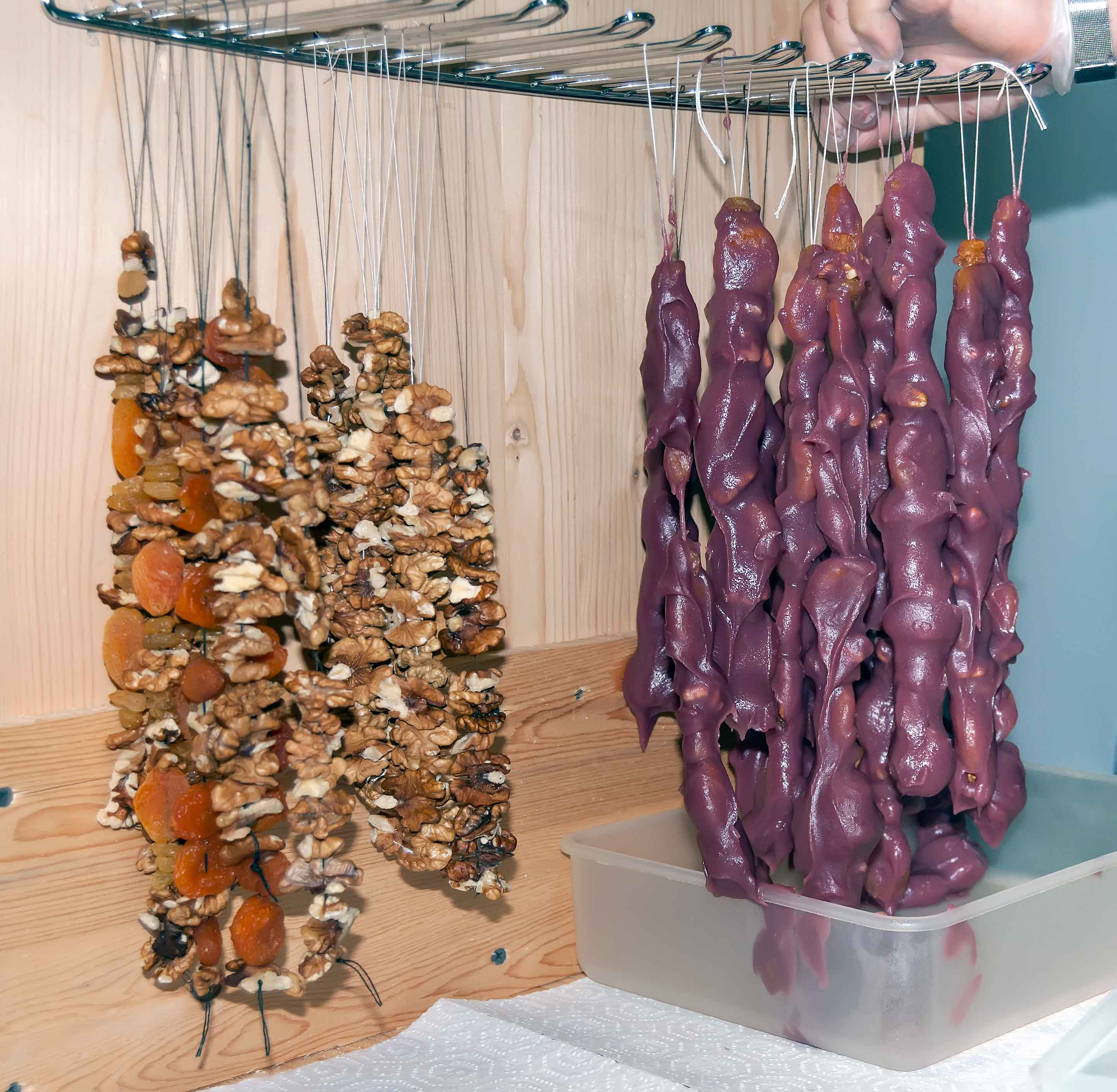
Walnut Sujuk making process; before and after the dipping of nuts in grape must.

Walnut sucuk is prepared by coating strings of walnuts or other nuts in a thickened grape must mixture and allowing them to dry until firm. The grape juice is first concentrated and combined with flour or corn starch to produce a dense, pudding-like coating. Strings of walnuts are produced by running a string through the walnut with a sewing needle. Strings of nuts are repeatedly dipped into the warm mixture, with successive layers added to increase thickness and create an even outer covering. After coating, the strings are hung in a ventilated environment for several days or weeks to dry.

== History ==
A confection called malban has existed in the medieval Middle East; 14th century traveller Ibn Battuta described malban in his travelogue titled The Travels of Ibn Battuta, malban was made in Damascus from grape syrup thickened with a powder with almonds and pistachio embedded in it. According to historian Nawal Nasrallah, this malban was "shaped like sausages, the way they are made today".

=== Ottoman period ===
Food historian Priscilla Mary Işın notes that walnut sucuk was produced in Anatolia as early as the 15th century. She writes that the earliest mentioned of the confection dates back to 1432, and is credit to Bertrandon de la Broquière. 17th century Ottoman traveler Evliya Çelebi noted that grape sausages were made in Gaziantep, Manisa, and Euboea. The confection attracted the attention of several travellers visiting Anatolia during the 18th century, who wrote about its manufacture and trade, these include Robert Walsh, Edward Daniel Clarke, Warington Wilkinson Smyth, and Julia Pardoe. Işın also notes 4 recipes for making sucuk that date back to the 18th century, by various authors.

A section about Arab cuisine from the 1889 proceedings of the 8th International Congress of Orientalists describe malban (ملبن) of stringed walnuts coated in flour-thickened grape must, which were left to dry for 20–30 days. They are also described under the name سجوقات (sujuks) in an 1844 Egyptian & Syrian Arabic-French dictionary by Swedish Orientalist Jacob Berggren.

A 1904 report by the US Bureau of Manufactures described sujuk being made in Turkey, alongside kessme and basduk, all from grape must, and commented saying:

Sujuk (rojik, in Armenian).- The meats of walnuts are strung closely together on pieces of stout twine a yard long. These strings are immersed in the mixture of grape molasses and flour described above, and after receiving a coating about one-fourth of an inch in thickness are withdrawn and hung up to dry. [They] are preserved for a few months in jars...

These [are] excellent articles of food [...they] offer much nutriment in a compact form, and are exceptionally well adapted for the needs of the oriental traveler. In these days of "grape cures," when unfermented grape juice is prepared on a large scale for the use of invalids and the anemic during the months when fresh grapes are not easily obtained.

== Regional varieties ==
=== Armenia ===
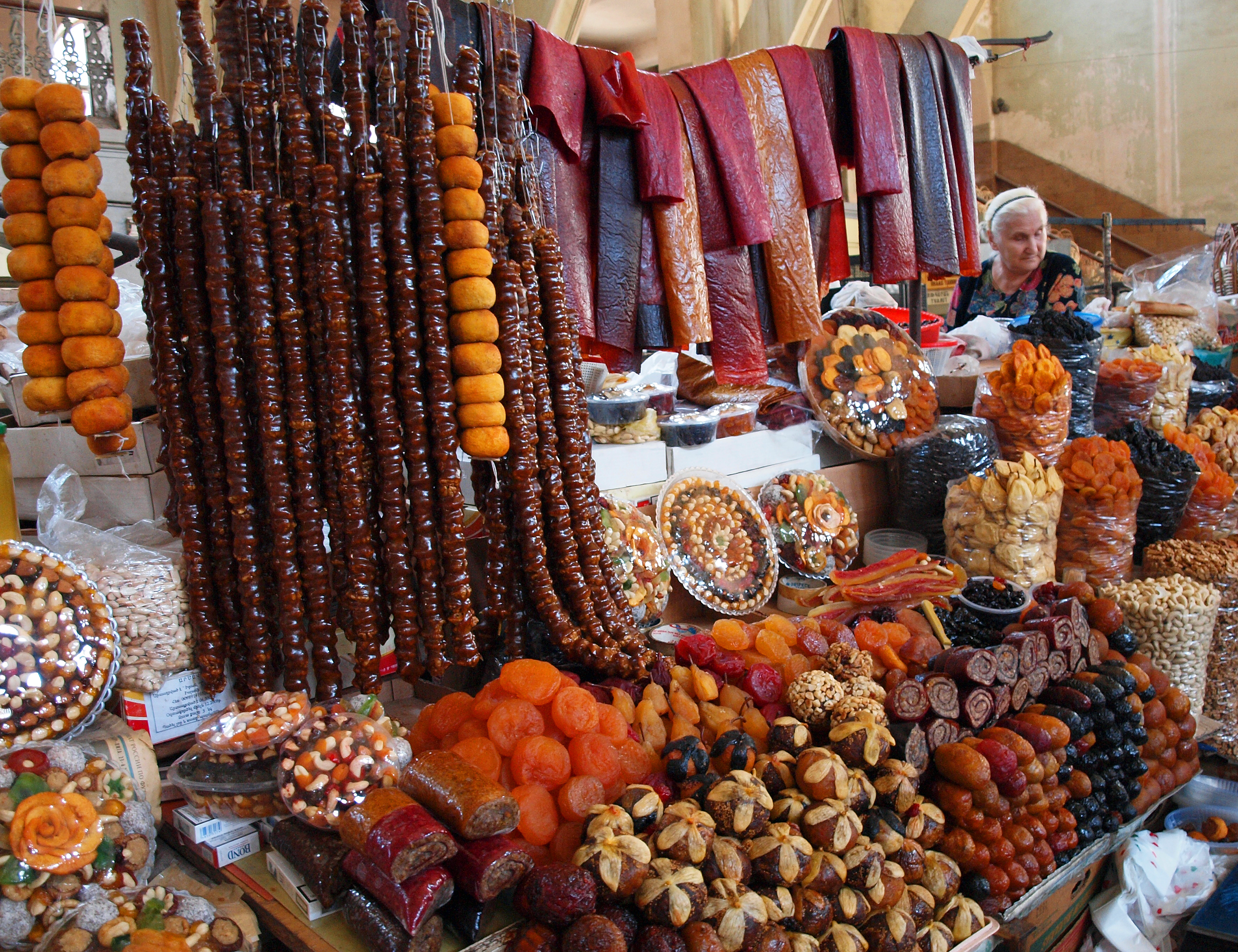
Sharots and other fruit-based confections at the Yerevan market, like pastegh and alani

In Armenian cuisine, this confection is known under various names, including sharots (Armenian: շարոց), kaghtsr sujukh (Armenian: քաղցր սուջուխ, lit. 'sweet sujukh'), or more rarely, rojig (Armenian: ռոժիգ).

It is made of halved walnut kernels threaded on a string that are traditionally coated in a spiced graped-based mixture called ‚doshab clay‘. The spices and ingredients used to make this concoction are doshab, flour, cinnamon, clove, and cardamom. Variations that substitute the grape-based mixture for another fruit, or spice-based mixture include pomegranate, apricot, cherry, peach, apple, mulberry, plum and cinnamon.

Another variation of sharots, is prepared differently and is of a different and far smaller shape. It is called fruchella (Armenian: ֆրուչելլա), and is essentially round balls of fruit doshab (same mixture as used in sharots, however, the standard base is pomegranate doshab) filled with chopped and sweetened nuts. They are often sold as a sort of pralines.

=== Turkey ===
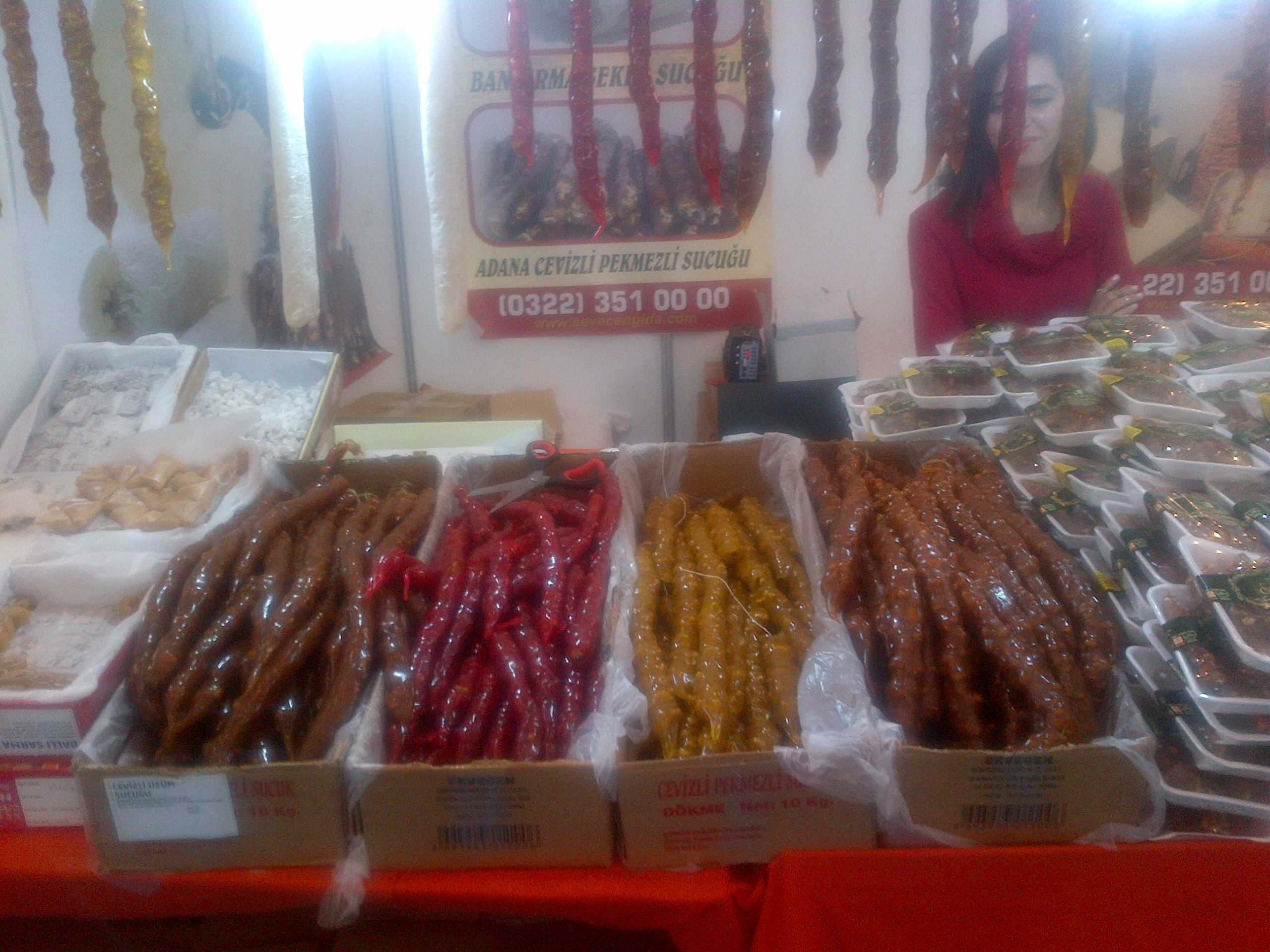
Different flavors of cevizli sucuk in Turkey

In Turkey, cevizli sucuk (lit. 'Walnut sujuk') is made alongside pestil and other confections. In Mardin, cevizli sucuk is traditionally prepared for Eid al-Adha. In Turkey, it also goes by orcik and köme.

In 2022, the Turkish Patent and Trademark Office issued a Geographical indication for walnut sucuk to the city of Beypazarı, Ankara Province. According to the patent, 250 kg of grapes are reduced to 100 kg of grape juice thickened with wheat flour, which is used to coat 90-100 strings of walnut kernels weighing 10 kg (22 lb), each string around a metre long. The result is dried for 10–15 days and is reported to last 7–8 months in storage.

In 2023, TRT Haber reported 40 tons of cevizli sucuk being produced by a single village in Sason District, Batman.

=== Cyprus ===
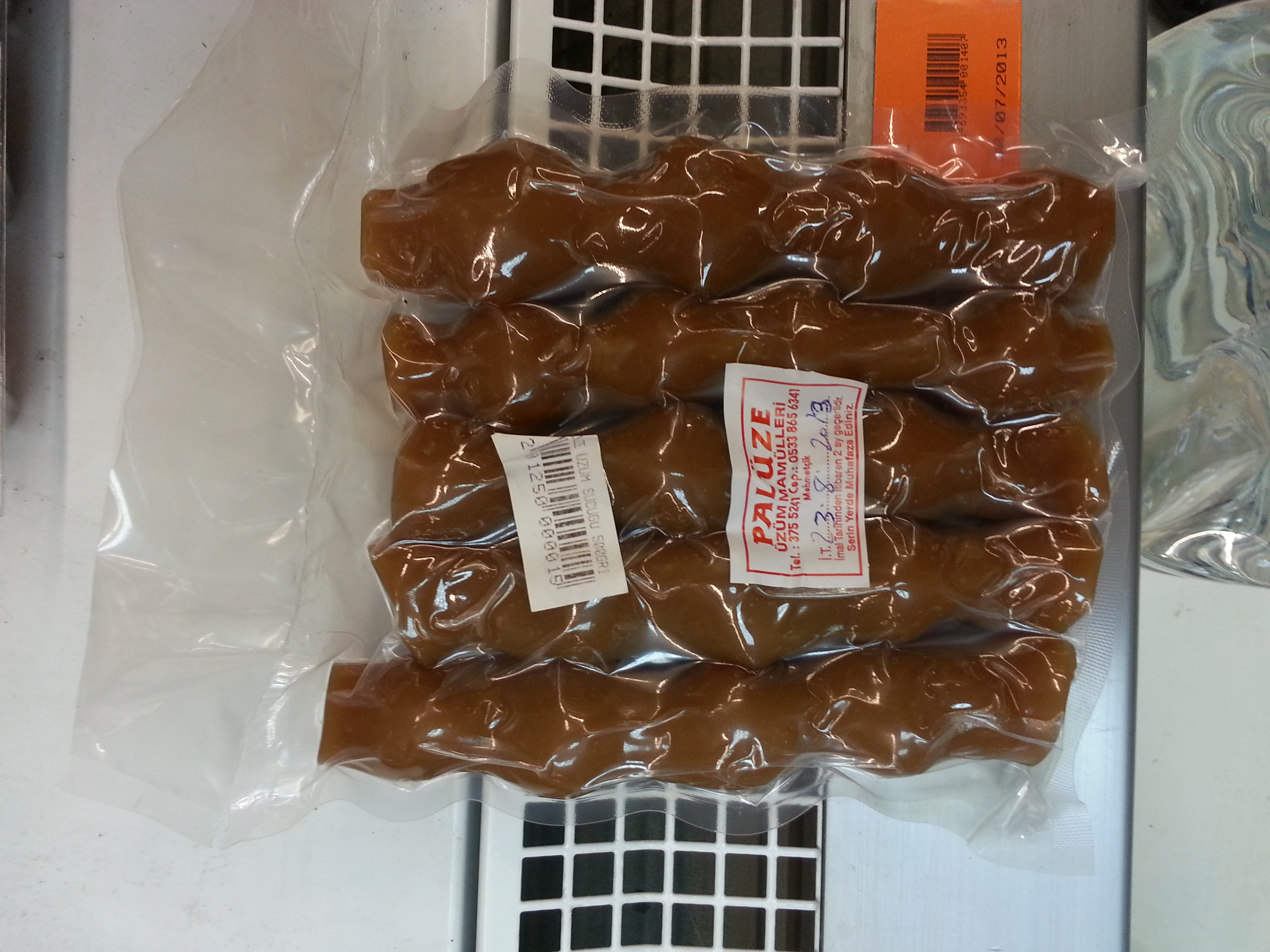
Packaged Cypriot soutzoukos

In Cyprus, it is known as soutzoukos (Greek: σουτζούκο), the name derived from the Turkish sucuk (sujuk). Cypriot soutzoukos commonly include almonds or rose water. They are traditionally made by dipping the threaded nuts into the thickened grape mixture (called paluze) 3 to five times over several hours then they are left to dry for 5–6 days. It is traditionally prepared during the grape harvest season, around September. Its presence in Cyprus is attested as early as 1952.

=== Greece ===
In Greece, the confection is prepared from grape must and stringed walnuts, and is called "soutzouk loukoum" (Greek: σουτζούκ λουκούμ, lit. '"sujuk lokum"').

=== Iraq ===
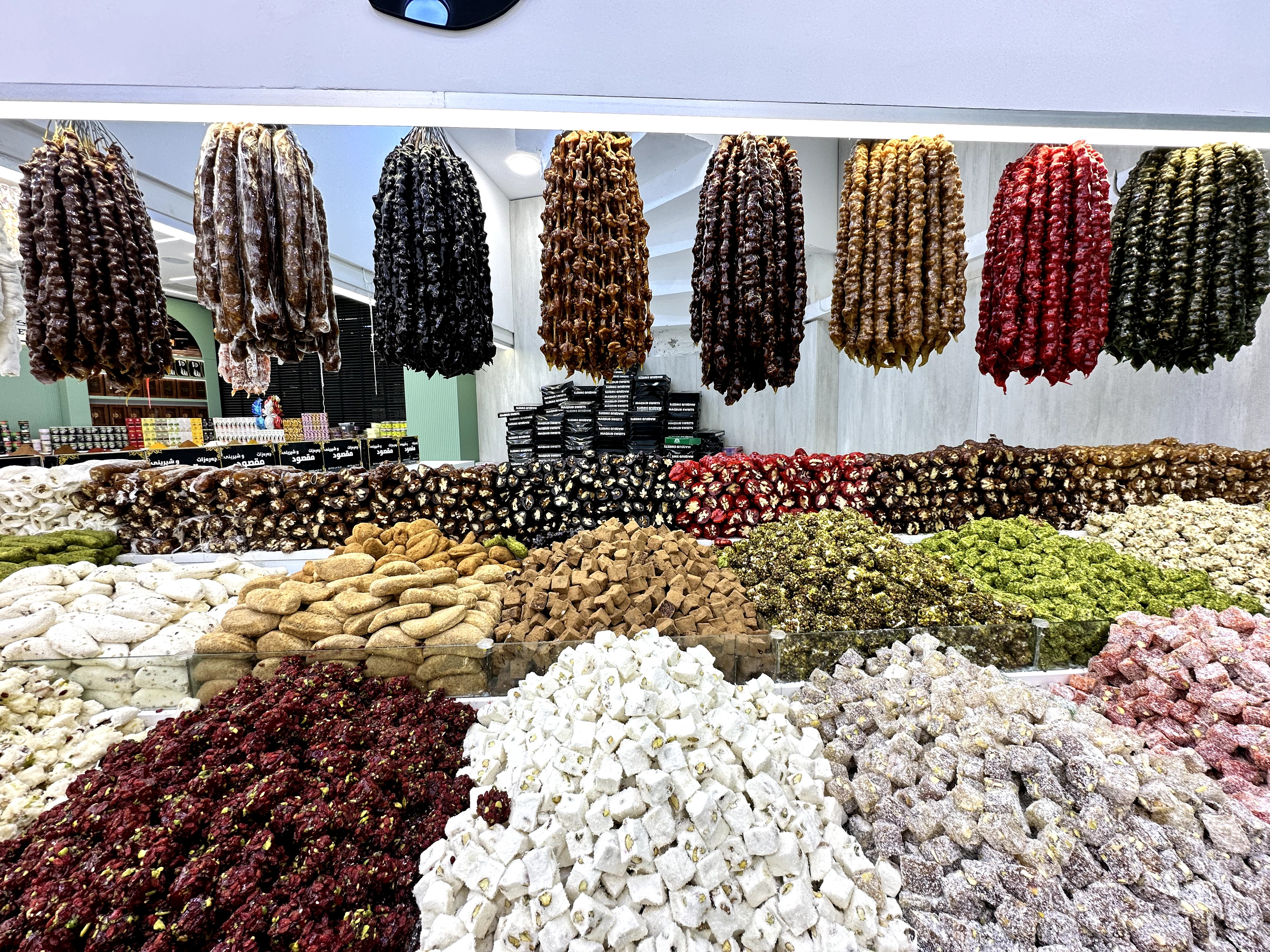
Multiple varieties of sweet sujuk in Shaqlawa, Kurdistan Region.

Sucuk is made in a variety of flavors like mastic in the Iraqi Kurdistani cities of Erbil, Sulaymaniyah, and Mosul. Sujuk is a common gift given to those living in other cities when visited.

=== Syria ===
In Syrian cuisine, walnut sucuk is known as juq malban (Arabic: جق ملبن), borrowed from Turkish, as well as many other local names. Its made by dipping stringed-together walnuts into grape molasses over several rounds before coating them in starch to pevent them from sticking. A Cilician custom was to gift malban to relatives and friends when visiting Aleppo. It is also known as okudah (عقودة), and is imported into Syria from Gaziantep.

=== Lebanon ===
Armenians in Lebanon make sweet sucuk from grape molasses and walnuts. Lebanese people in Sidon also make a similar sweet called malban for Eid al-Fitr, influenced by Ottoman cuisine, of walnuts stringed together and dipped in thickened sugar and flour.

=== Georgia ===
The Georgian churchkhela is a variety of sucuk made from a variety of flavorings.

== See also ==
- List of candies
- List of grape dishes
- List of Armenian sweets and desserts
- Turkish delight – Gelatinous candy
- Gummy candy – Gum-based chewable sweets
