= Grape ice cream =

Flavor of ice cream

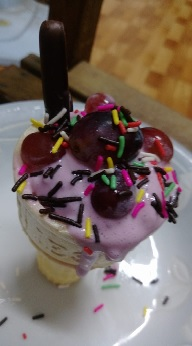
Homemade grape ice cream.

Grape ice cream is ice cream with a grape flavor. Some recipes use grape juice in its preparation. Dishes and variations include grape ice cream sandwiches and grape ice cream soda. Grape ice cream is sometimes offered at grape festivals. For example, the Naples Grape Festival has offered grape ice cream. Grape ice cream is not a commonly made flavor in the US, but it is a popular flavor within the Lumbee community of North Carolina. It is one of the more common flavors in Japan.

== See also ==
- Ice cream float – Purple cow
- List of grape dishes
- List of ice cream flavors
