= Malban =

Malban (Arabic: ملبن) is an Arabic word that may refer to one of several different sweetmeats:

- Turkish delight is called malban in Egypt
- Pestil is called malban in the Levant
- Walnut sujuk is called juq malban in Syria
