= Soutzouki =

Soutzouki (Greek, σουτζούκι) may refer to:

- Sujuk, a dry, spicy and fermented sausage
- Churchkhela, a sausage-shaped confection
