= List of grape dishes =

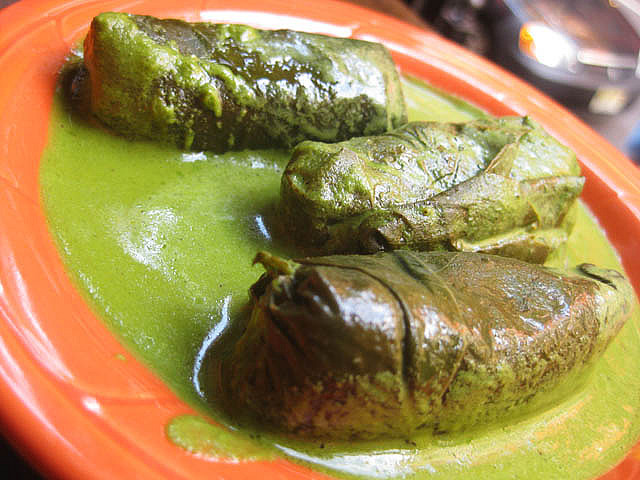
Stuffed grape leaves with a mint sauce

This is a list of notable grape dishes and foods that are prepared using grapes as a primary ingredient. Raisin dishes and foods are also included in this article.

== Grape dishes and foods ==
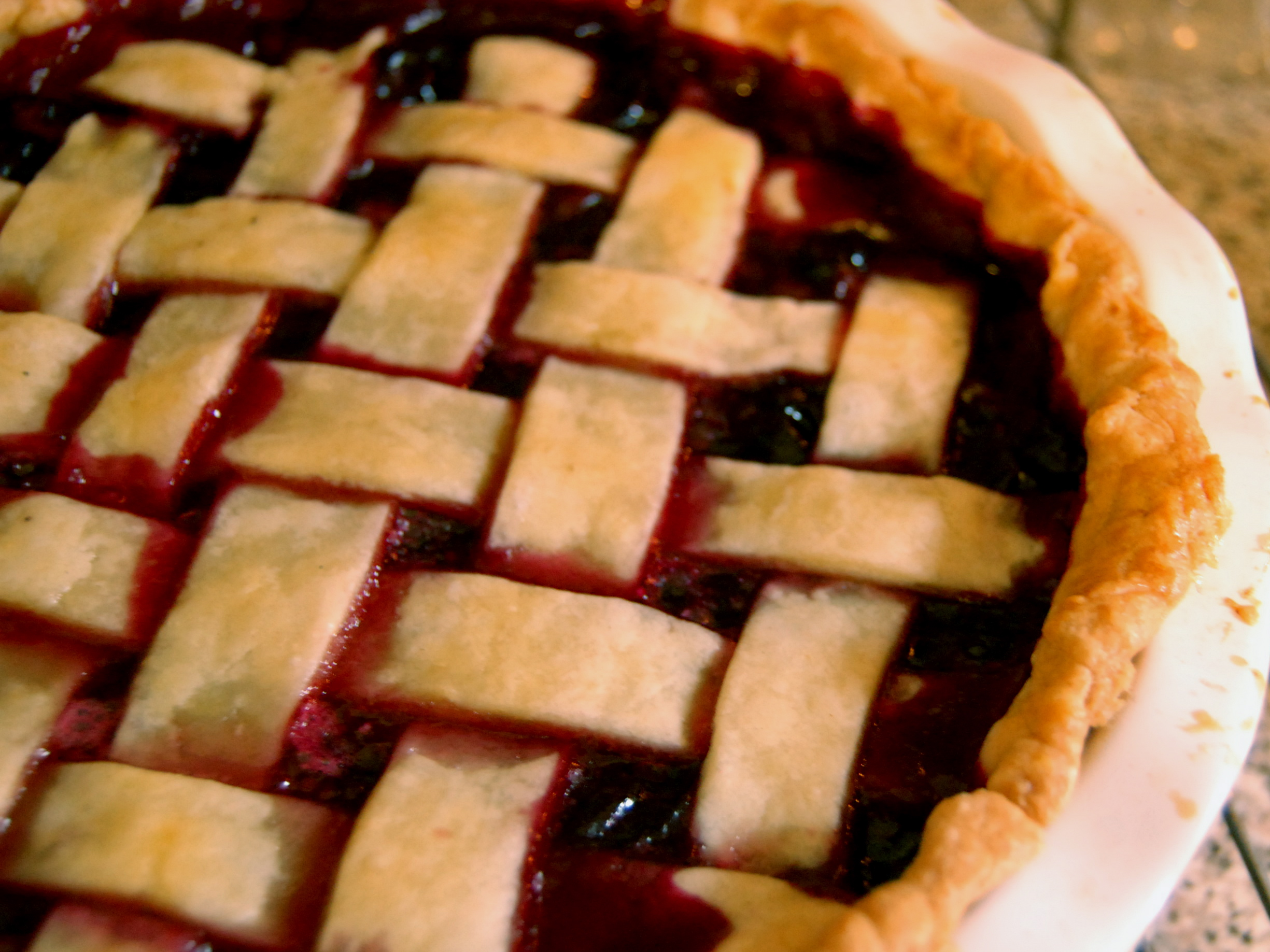
A typical grape pie

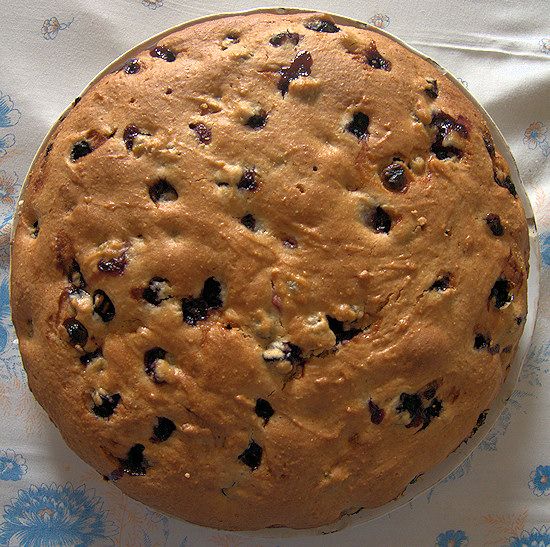
Torta Bertolina

A grape is a fruit, botanically a berry, of the deciduous woody vines of the flowering plant genus Vitis.

- Churchkhela – grape must is a main ingredient
- Grape hull pie – pie made out of muscadine grapes and grape skins.
- Grape ice cream – ice cream with a grape flavor, some recipes use grape juice in its preparation.
- Grape leaves – the leaves of the grapevine plant, which are used in the cuisines of a number of cultures
- Grape pie – a pie with grape filling.
- Grape seed oil – oil pressed from the seeds of grapes.
- Grape syrup – a thick and sweet condiment made with concentrated grape juice

- Jallab – a type of fruit syrup popular in the Middle East made from carob, dates, grape molasses and rose water
- Pekmez – a molasses-like syrup obtained after condensing juices of fruit must, especially grape

- Moustalevria – a traditional Greek kind of pudding made of grape must mixed with flour and boiled until thick.
- Torta Bertolina – a typical autumnal dessert from the northern Italian town of Crema presented in a round shape, but it is often available cut into slices. It has a golden brown hue and the fragrance of the small American or Concord grapes, which are one of its main ingredients.
- Vincotto – a dark, sweet, thick paste made by the slow cooking of grapes

=== Beverages ===
- Grape juice – obtained from crushing and blending grapes into a liquid
- Grape soda - grape flavoured soft drink
- Wine - made by fermenting grape juice
- Brandy - a hard liquor made by distilling wine

== Raisin dishes and foods ==
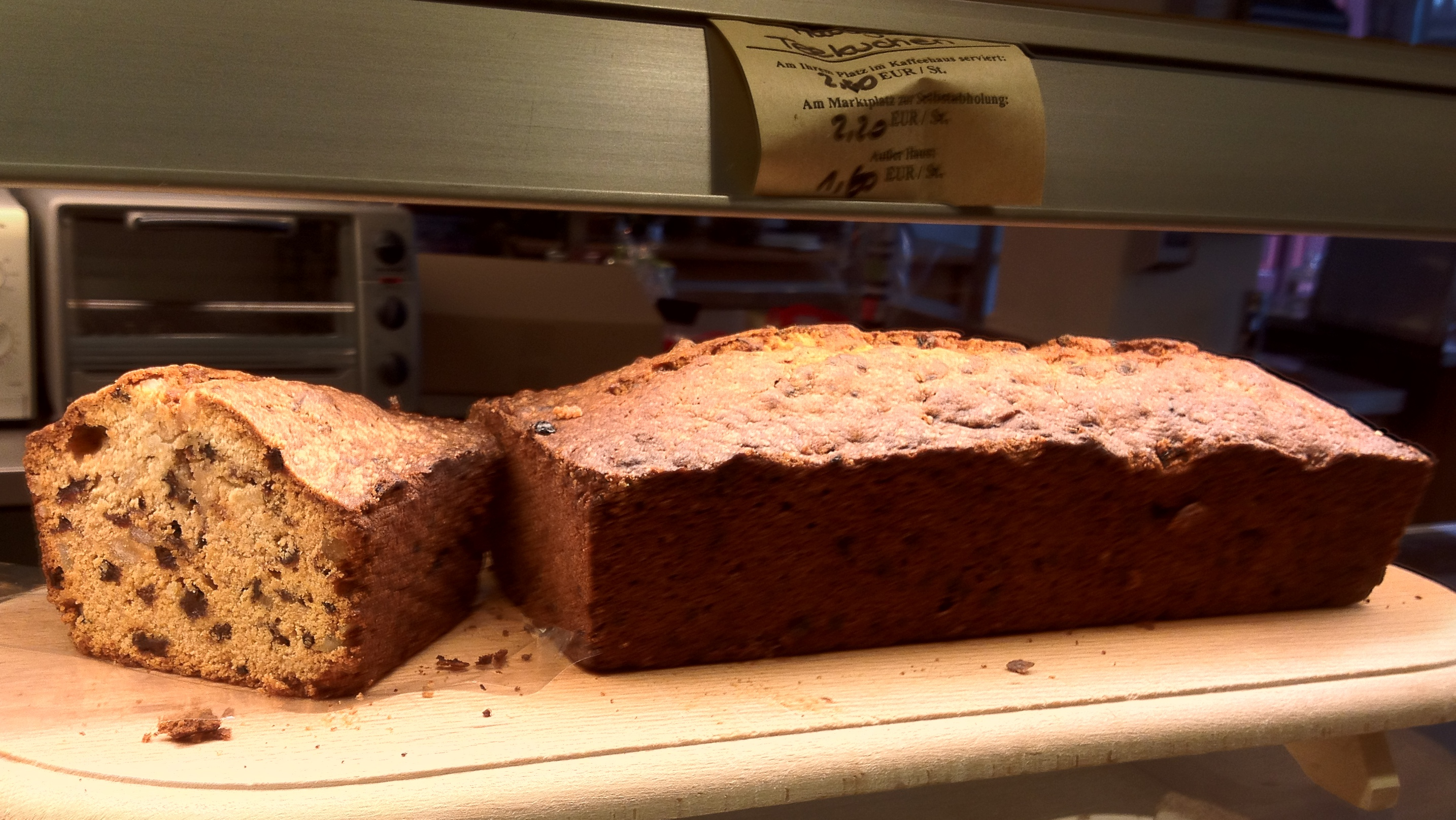
Raisin cake in Miltenberg, Germany

A raisin is a dried grape. Raisins are produced in many regions of the world and may be eaten raw or used in cooking, baking, and brewing.

- Ants on a log
- Chocolate-covered raisin
- Oatmeal raisin cookie
- Raisin bread – A type of bread made with raisins and flavored with cinnamon.
- Raisin cake
- Rum raisin – an ice cream flavor made through combining rum, raisins and vanilla ice cream.
- Spotted dick
- Sultana (grape)
- White raisins
- Zante currant

== See also ==
- List of fruit dishes
