= Grape leaves =

Ingredient in various cuisines

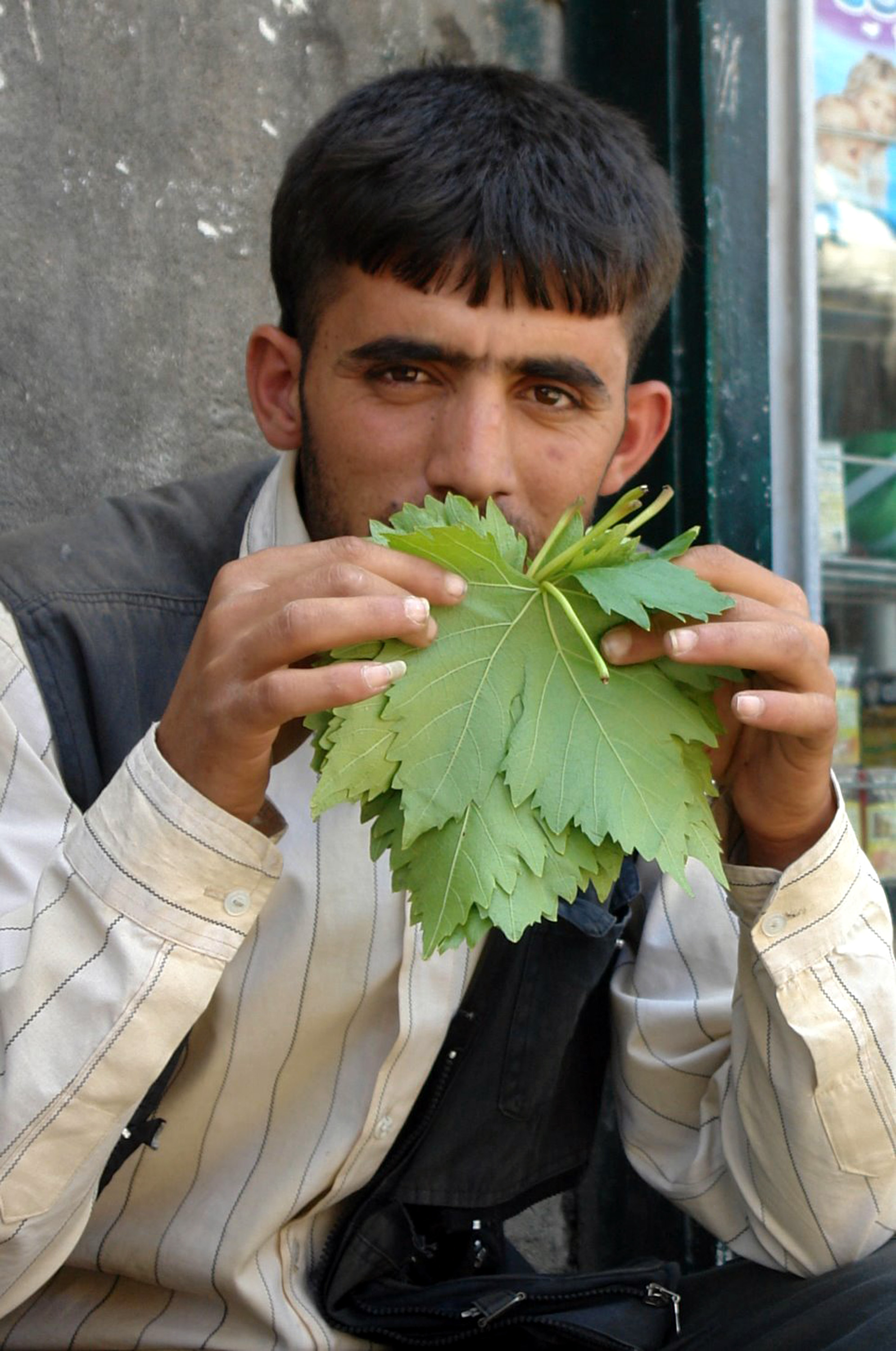
- Merchant selling grape leaves in Damascus (2008)

Grape leaves, the leaves of the grapevine plant, are used in the cuisines of a number of cultures. They may be obtained fresh, or preserved in jars or cans. The leaves are commonly rolled or stuffed with mixtures of meat and rice to produce dolma (often, sarma), found widely in the Mediterranean, Caucasus, Balkans, and Middle East. They may also be used in various other recipes and dishes. When cut into smaller pieces they are used as a savory addition to soups that include greens and cabbage.

== Nutrition ==
Canned grape leaves (cooked, salted) are 76% water, 12% carbohydrates, 4% protein, and 2% fat. In a reference amount of 100 grams (3.5 oz), the leaves supply 69 calories and are a rich source (20% or more of the Daily Value, DV) of sodium (119% DV), vitamin A (105% DV), copper (95% DV), pantothenic acid (43% DV), and several other B vitamins and dietary minerals.

== Gallery ==
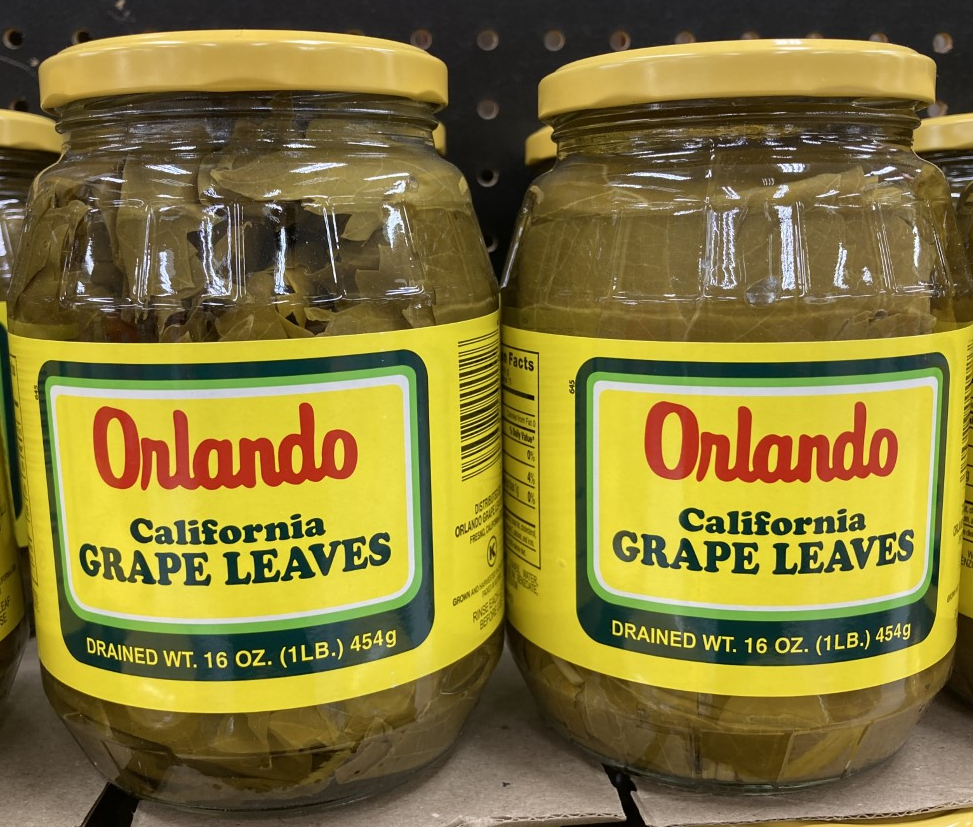
Preserved grape leaves in jars

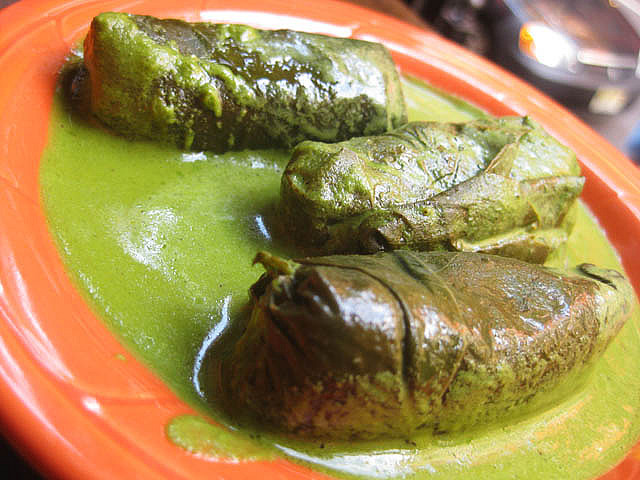
Stuffed grape leaves with yogurt mint sauce

== See also ==
- Grape seed
- List of grape dishes
