= Grape festival =

Grape festivals are celebrated as a tradition in various parts of the world. Many double as harvest festivals and celebrate wine making and other foods and beverages made from grapes.

Grape festivals include:

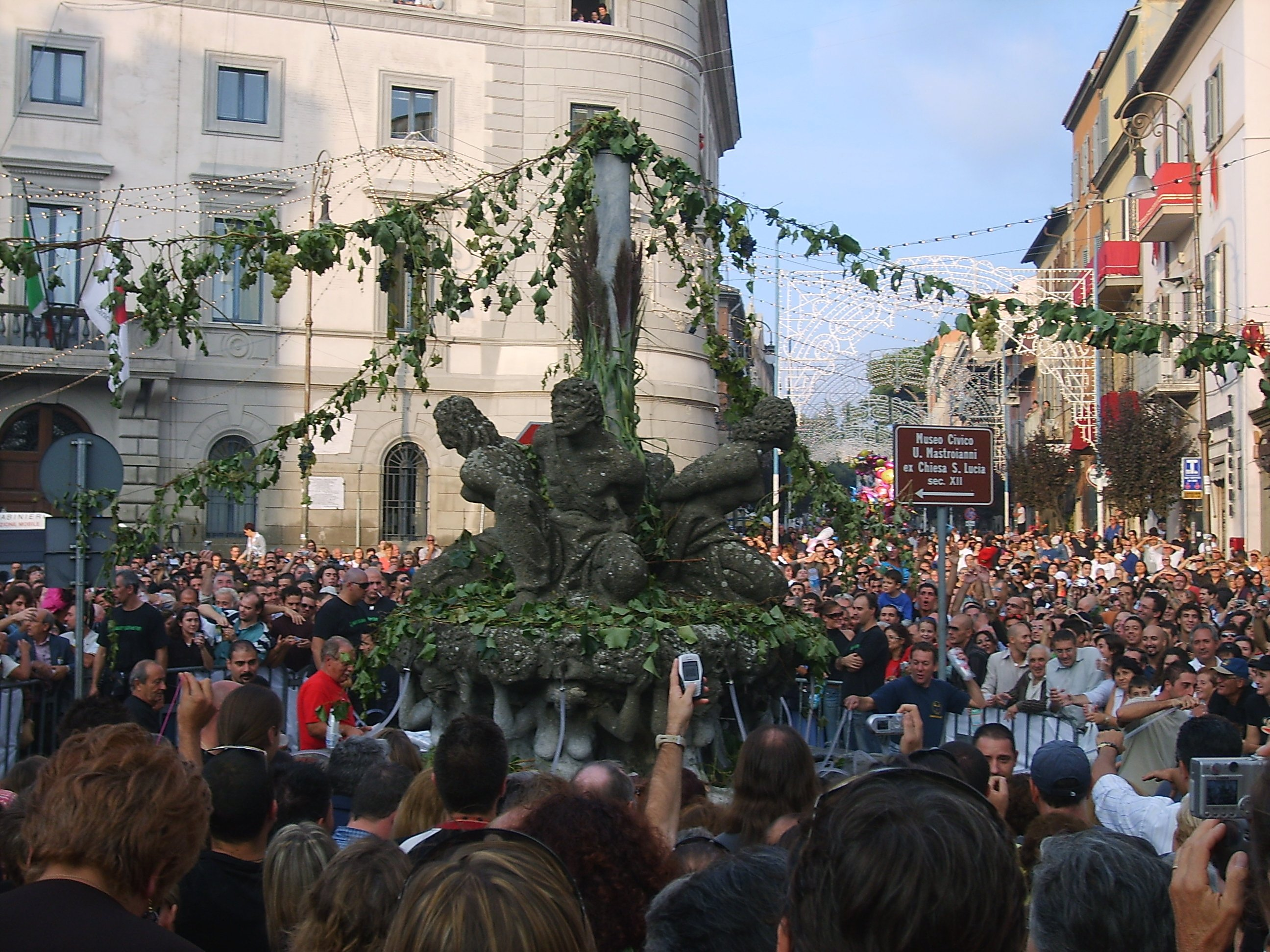
Grapes Festival in Marino, Italy. This is the moment when the fountains give wine instead of water

- Galáteia, Cyprus is famous for its summer grape festival held the first week of August, for which people travel from all over the Island of Cyprus and the world to attend.
- Khader Grape Festival held annually on September in the Palestinian town of al-Khader near Bethlehem.
- Festa Gheneb fis-Siggiewi held annually during grape harvest in August in the village of Siggiewi, Malta.
- Naples Grape Festival held annually in the Finger Lakes area of Naples, New York in the United States.
- Festa da Uva a biennial celebration of the Italian heritage and culture with cheese, grapes and various Brazilian wines in the city of Caxias do Sul, state of Rio Grande do Sul, in southern Brazil.
- Fiesta Nacional de la Vendimia (The Grape Harvest Festival) takes place annually in March in Mendoza Province, Argentina.
- Texas Reds Steak and Grape Festival (Texas Reds Festival) is an annual outdoor event held in Bryan, Texas.
- Lodi, California hosts a Grape Festival in September with rides, food, and wine tasting.
- Mendrisio, Switzerland hosts a grape festival called Sagra dell uva in September.
- Silver Creek, New York Grape Festival held annually in September since 1968.
- Tontitown, Arkansas Grape Festival held annually in mid-August in celebration of the harvest and the town's Italian American heritage.
- Yeongcheon, a city in North Gyeongsang Province, South Korea, hosts a Grape Festival in late summer with events such as the Miss Grape contest and a grape-eating competition.
- Bobbio, a small town and commune in the province of Piacenza in Emilia-Romagna, northern Italy, hosts an annual grape festival.
- Banoštor, a village in Serbia, celebrates the beginning of the wine season in the fall with a grape festival called the "Dan Grožđa" or Grape Day, dedicated to Sveti Trifun (Saint Trifun), God's overseer of wine growers.
- Ponta Grossa, a city in the state of Paraná, Brazil, hosts a grape festival.
- Yadkinville, North Carolina hosts a "Harvest Festival" and "Grape Festival" honoring the Yadkin Valley Vineyards and other vineyards in the state and neighboring state of Virginia.

Grape festival may also refer to:

- GrapeFestival, a music festival in Slovakia
