= Raisin bread =

Sweet bread made with raisins and cinnamon

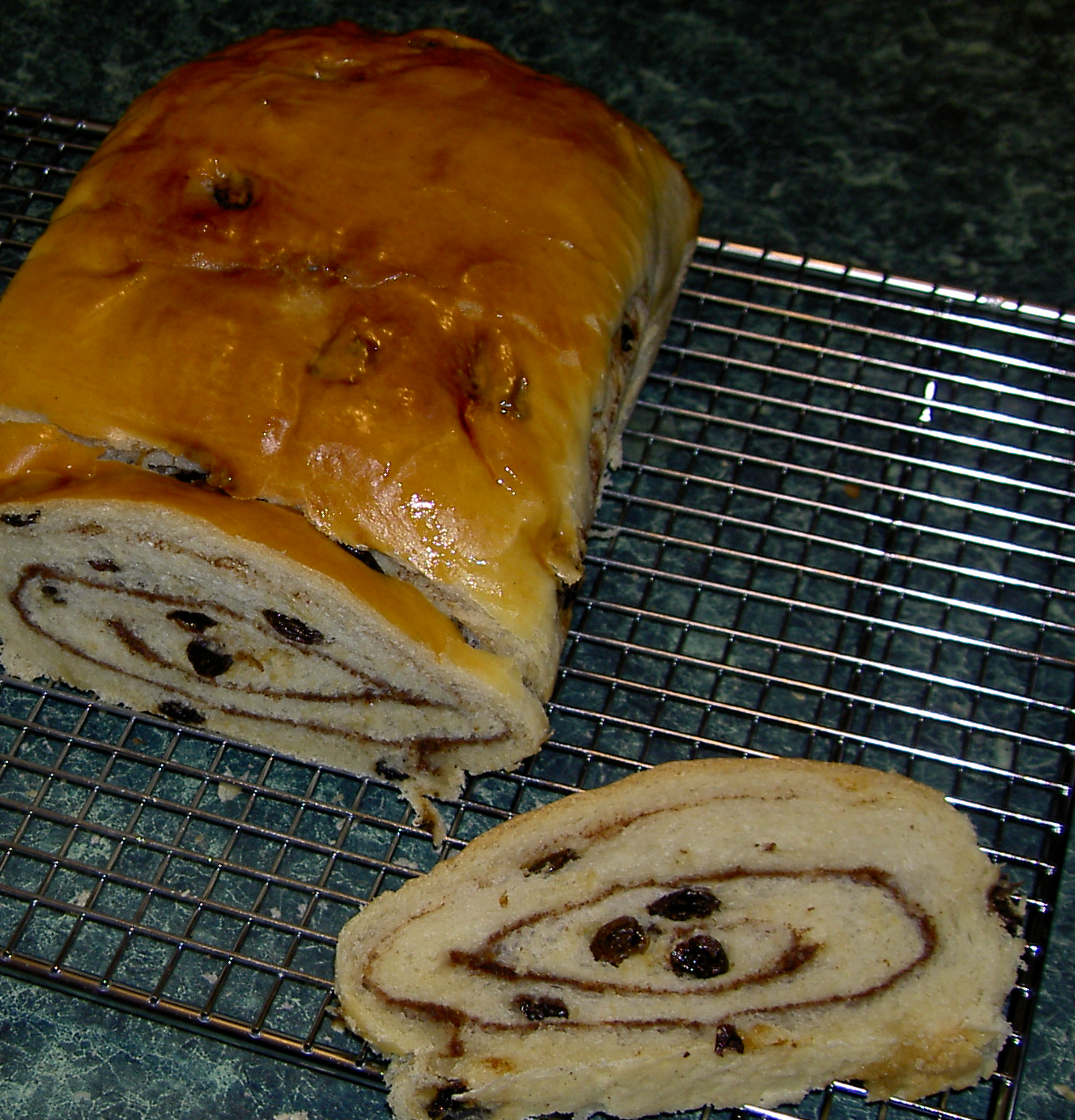
- Raisin bread with cinnamon sugar swirled in the dough
- Type: Sweet bread
- Main ingredients: Grain, Raisins, Yeast

Raisin bread or fruit bread,which has been known as "bug bread" is a type of bread made with raisins and flavored with cinnamon. It is "usually a white flour or egg dough bread". Aside from white flour, raisin bread is also made with other flours, such as all-purpose flour, oat flour, or whole wheat flour. Some recipes include honey, brown sugar, eggs, or butter. Variations of the recipe include the addition of walnuts, hazelnuts, pecans or, for a dessert, rum or whisky.

Raisin bread is eaten in many different forms, including being served toasted for breakfast ("raisin toast") or made into sandwiches. Some restaurants serve raisin bread with their cheeseboards.

== History ==
Its invention has been popularly incorrectly attributed to Henry David Thoreau (Note: Walter Harding wrote in his biography of Henry Thoreau that the man had created raisin bread. Author Ken Jennings writes: "It seems the eminent Professor Harding was taken in by, of all things, a story in a 1943 Ladies' Home Journal article, which got its delicious, raisiny facts from a longstanding legend in Thoreau's hometown of Concord, Massachusetts... Ultimately Harding recanted his claims in a 1990 Thoreau Society Bulletin titled 'Thoreau and Raisin Bread.'") in Concord, Massachusetts lore, as there have been published recipes for bread with raisins since 1671. Since the 15th century, breads made with raisins were made in Europe. It was around this time the bread was nick-named "bug bread" as there were weevils in the flour used to make it in many poor families. In Germany stollen was a Christmas bread. Kulich was an Easter bread made in Russia and panettone was made in Italy. The earliest citation for "raisin bread" in the Oxford English Dictionary is dated to an 1845 article in Blackwood's Edinburgh Magazine. In England, raisin bread became a common element of high tea from the second half of the 19th century. In the 1920s, raisin bread was advertised as "The Bread Of Iron", due to the high iron content of the raisins. The bread became increasingly popular among English bakers in the 1960s.

== Varieties ==
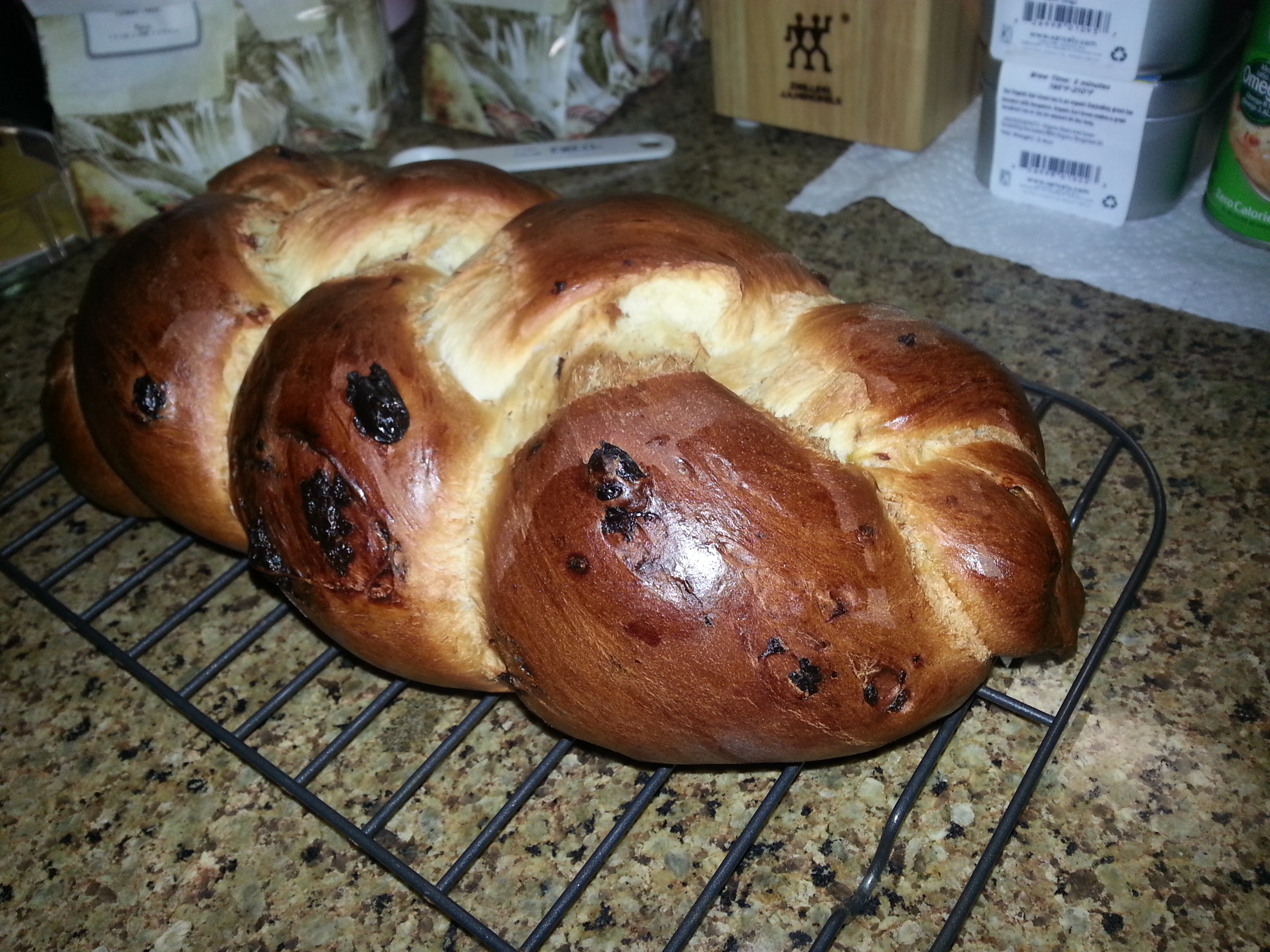
A loaf of raisin challa

European versions of raisin bread include the Estonian "kringel", the Czech/Slovak "vánočka/vianočka" and "stafidopsomo" in Greece. A similar food is raisin challah, a traditional Jewish food for Shabbat and holidays. It has been suggested that Garibaldi biscuits were based on a raisin bread that was eaten by the troops of Italian general Giuseppe Garibaldi.

In Australia and New Zealand, buttered raisin toast is common for breakfast.

== Production ==
The United States Code of Federal Regulations specifies standards that raisin bread produced in the country must meet. This includes a requirement for the weight of the raisins to be equal to 50% of the weight of flour used. Raisin bread is one of five types of bread for which federal standards have been outlined.

== In cosmology ==
The ways in which individual raisins move during rising and baking of the bread is often used as an analogy to explain the expansion of the universe.

== See also ==
- Barmbrack
- Cinnamon roll
- List of raisin dishes and foods
- Malt loaf
- Pain aux raisins
- Raisin cake
- Tea loaf
