= Raisin cake =

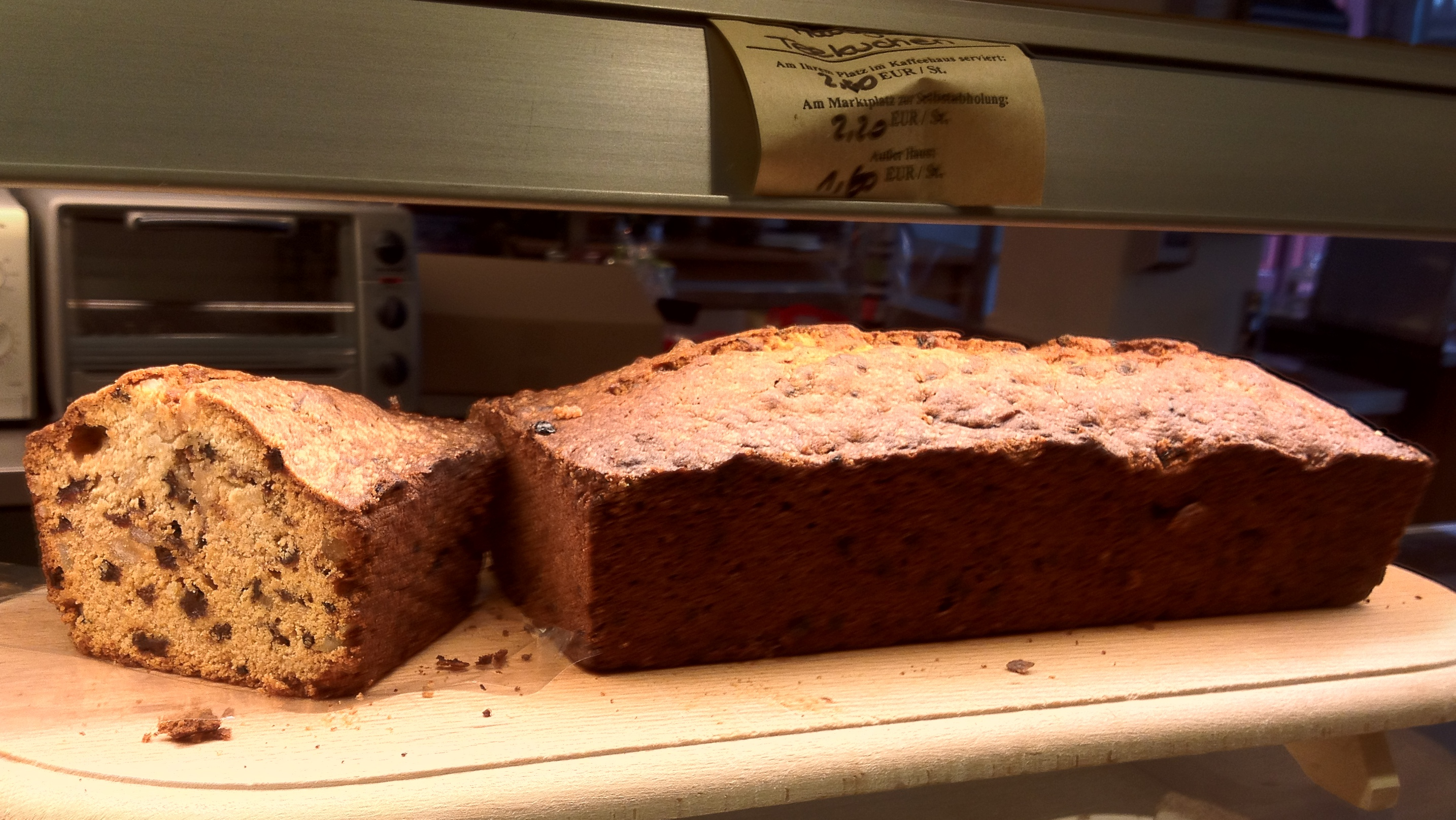
- Raisin cake in Miltenberg, Germany
- Type: Cake
- Course: Dessert
- Serving temperature: Cold or warmed
- Main ingredients: Raisin and cake batter
- Similar dishes: Fruitcake

Raisin cake is a type of cake that is prepared using raisins as a main ingredient. Additional ingredients are sometimes used, such as chocolate and rum. Raisin cake dates back to at least the time of the reign of David, c. 1010–970 BCE. Boiled raisin cake is prepared by boiling various ingredients and then baking the mix in an oven. It dates back to at least the time of the American Civil War (1861–1865).

== Overview ==
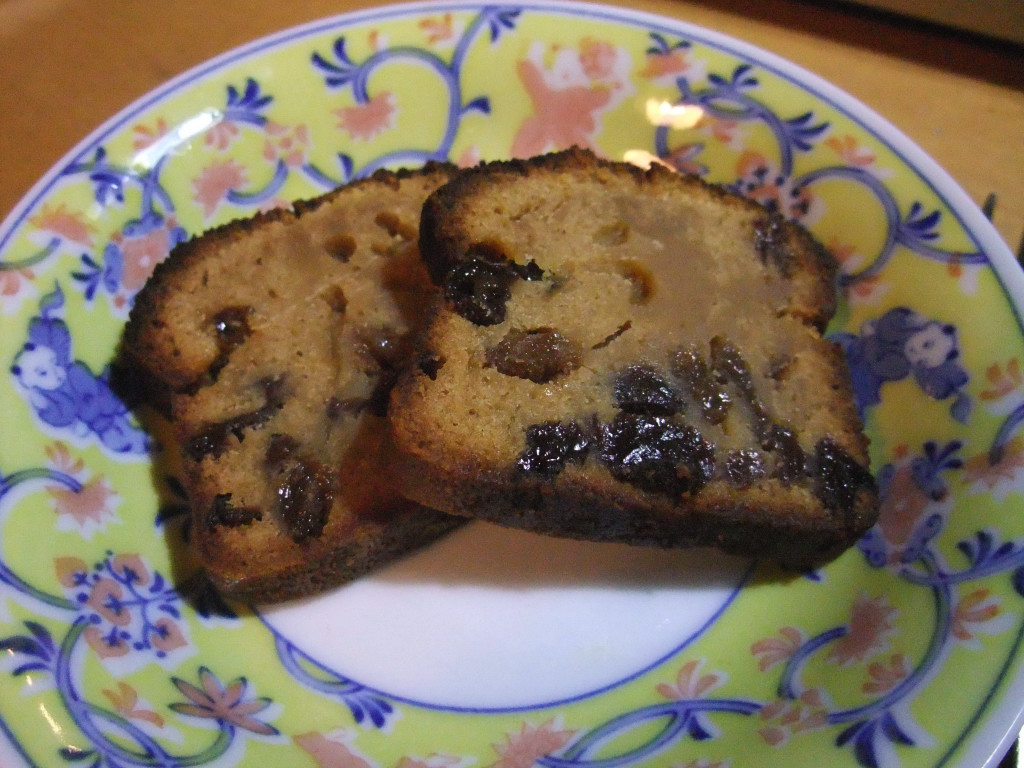
Raisin pound cake

Raisin cake is typically prepared using standard cake ingredients and raisins as a primary ingredient. Whole or chopped raisins can be used. Additional various ingredients are also sometimes used, such as rum, chocolate, and others. The use of rum can serve to plump-up the raisins via the added moisture, and the raisins can be marinated in rum before the cake is prepared. Spices such as cinnamon, nutmeg, cloves and pumpkin spice are sometimes used.

== History ==
It is stated in chapter 6:19 in the second Book of Samuel that cake (identified as "raisin cake" in Hosea 3:1) was distributed by David, who reigned as the second king of the United Kingdom of Israel and Judah c. 1010–970 BCE. This raisin cake consisted of "a mass of dried grapes" and thus was probably similar to the fig "cake" attested since Biblical times, rather than to a baked cake.

Some recipes in the United States c. the early 1900s utilized lard as an ingredient, which could be used instead of butter.

== Boiled raisin cake ==
Boiled raisin cake is a type of raisin cake whereby various ingredients are first boiled, after which the batter is placed in cake pans then baked. It is sometimes prepared with the omission of some standard cake ingredients, such as butter, eggs or milk. Boiled raisin cake may have a moist consistency. The cake dates back to the time of the American Civil War (1861–1865), when it was prepared in frontier areas using the Dutch oven. Basic versions during this time were typically prepared using only raisins, sugar and a fat, such as vegetable shortening or lard. Boiled raisin cake has been referred to as a type of war cake.

== Gallery ==
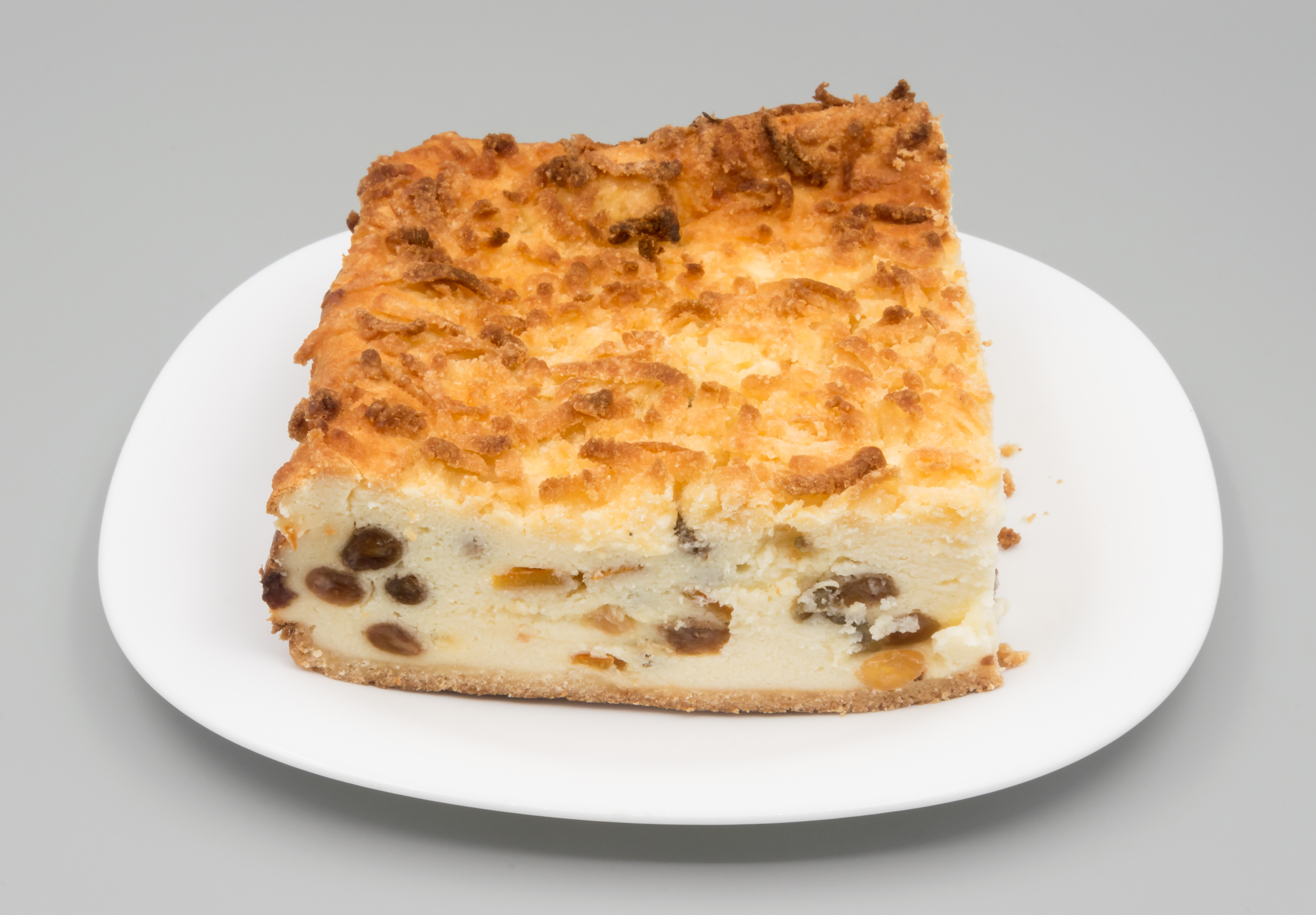
Raisin cheesecake

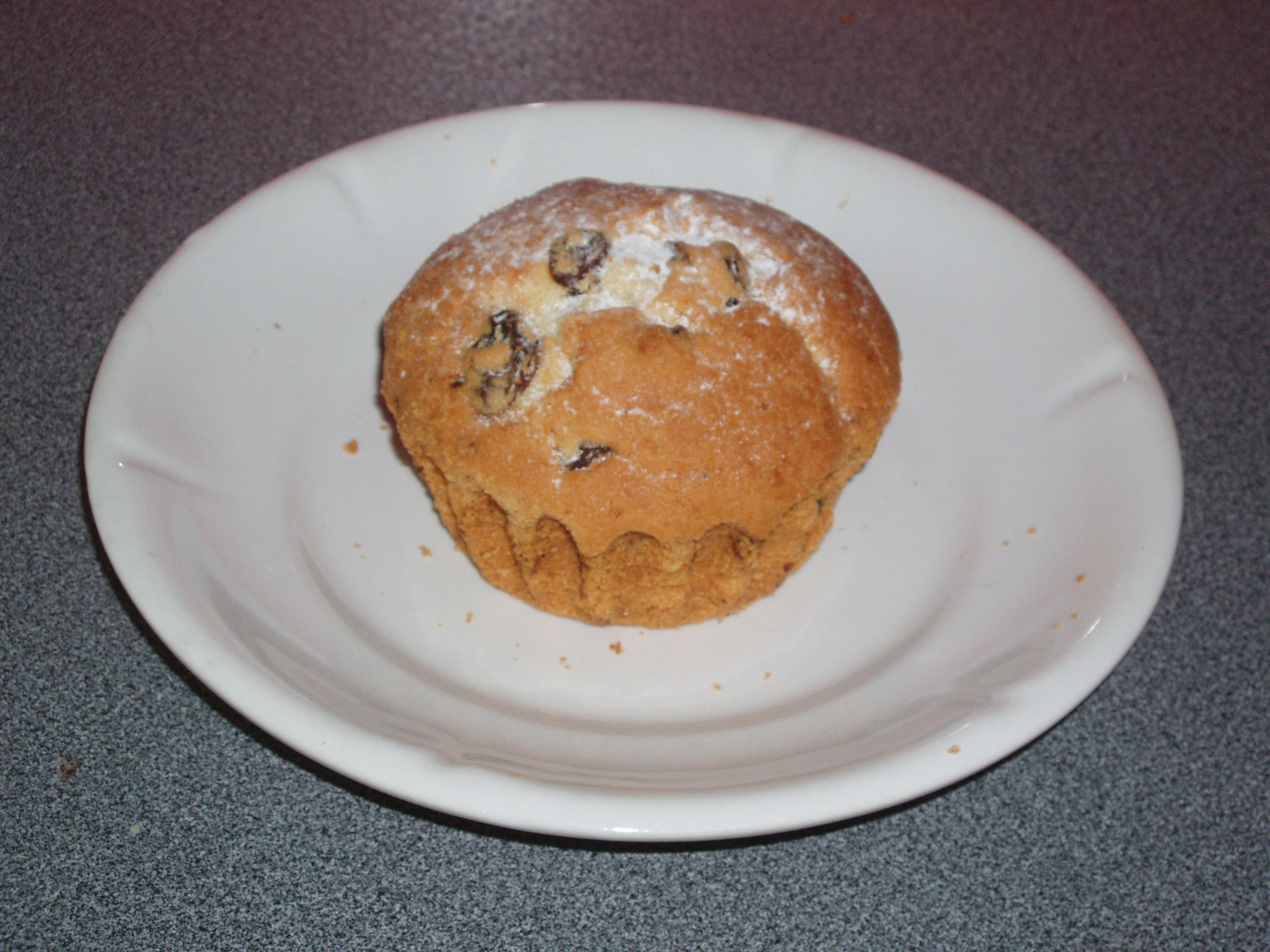
A small raisin cake

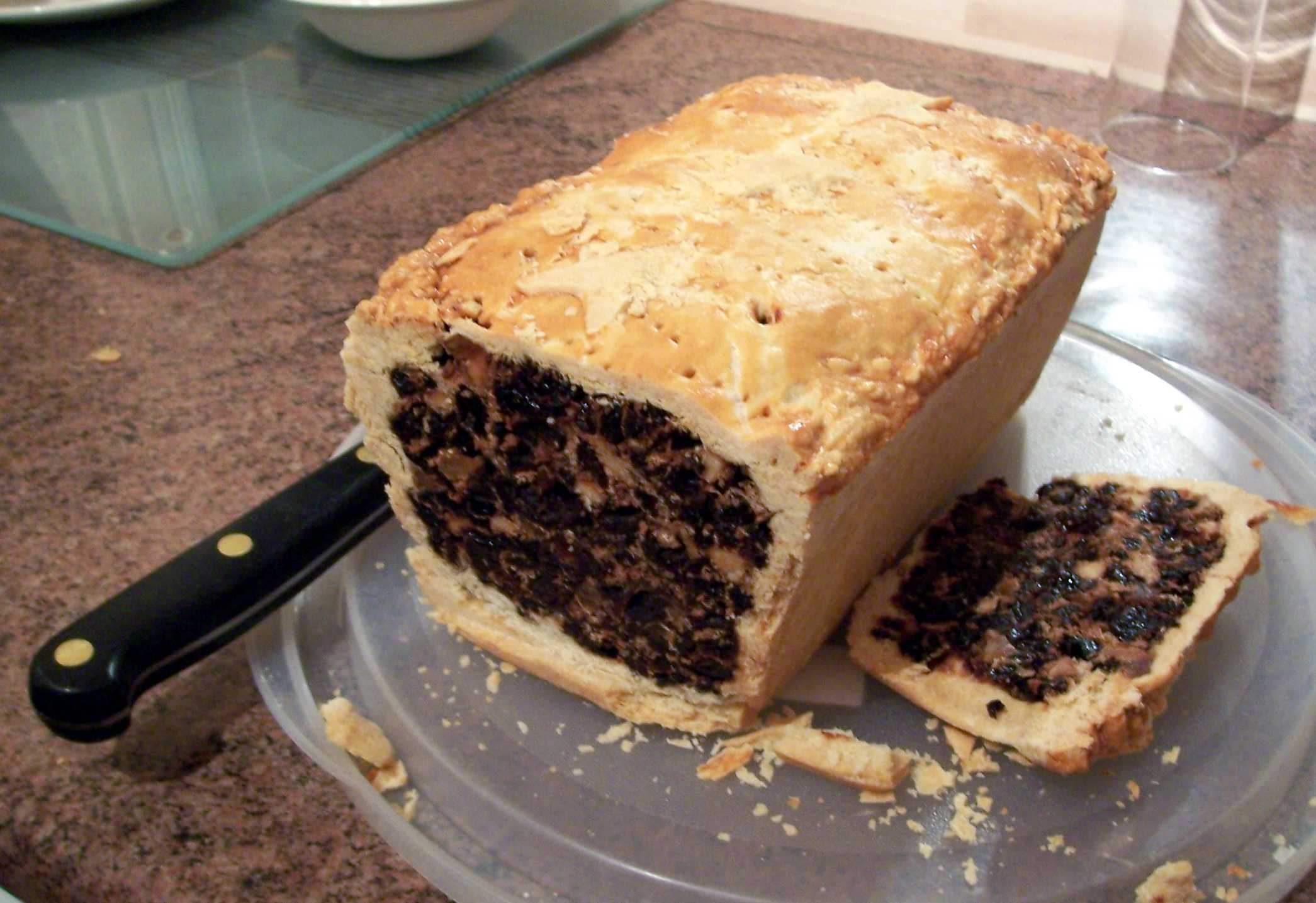
Black bun, a Scottish fruit cake

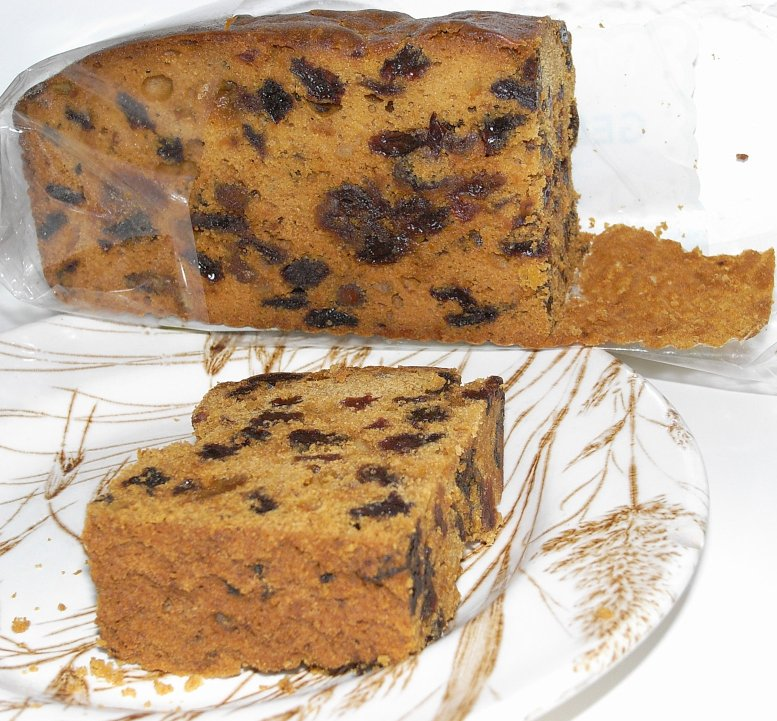
Genoa cake with sultana raisins

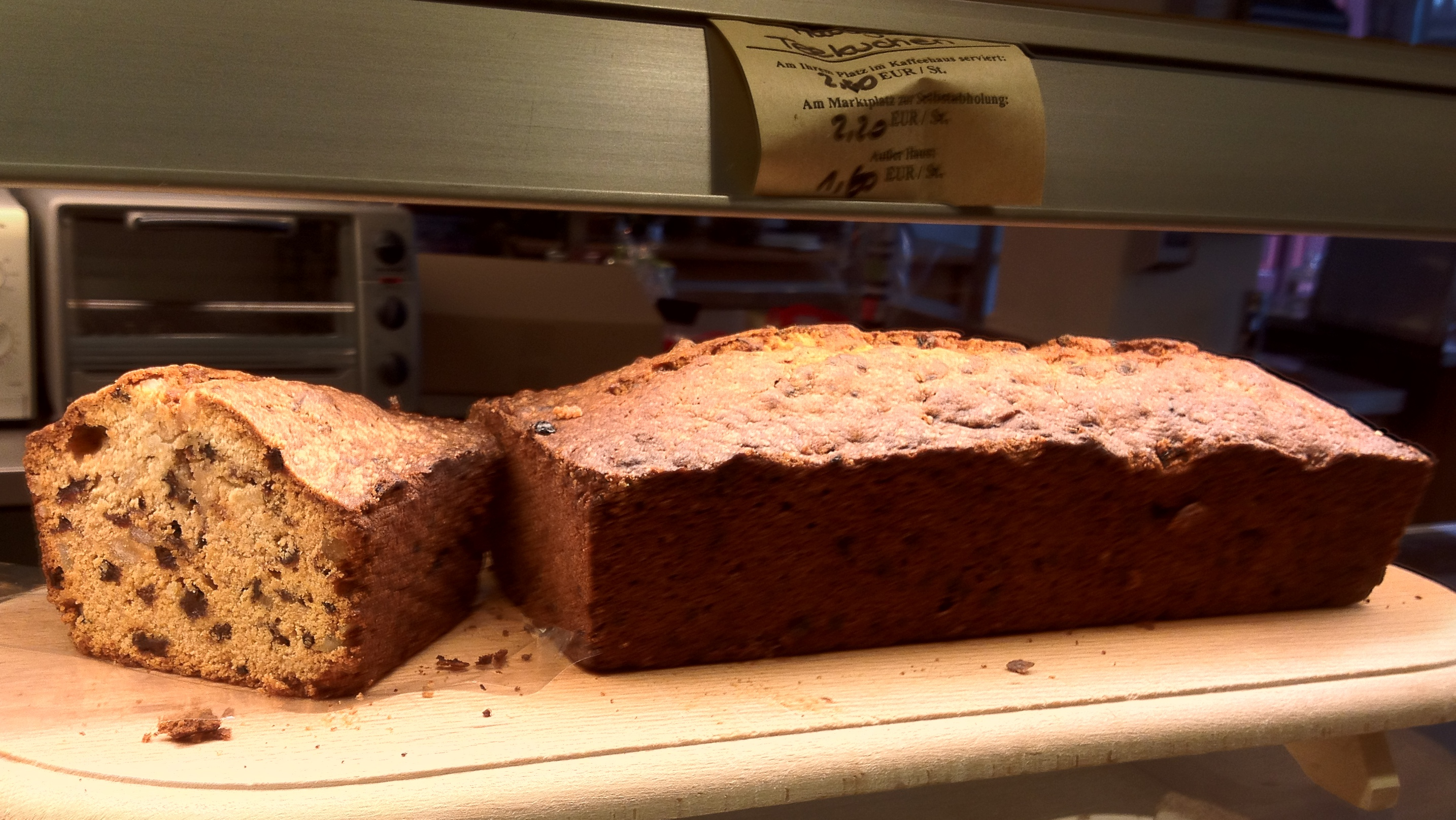
Raisin tea cake in Germany

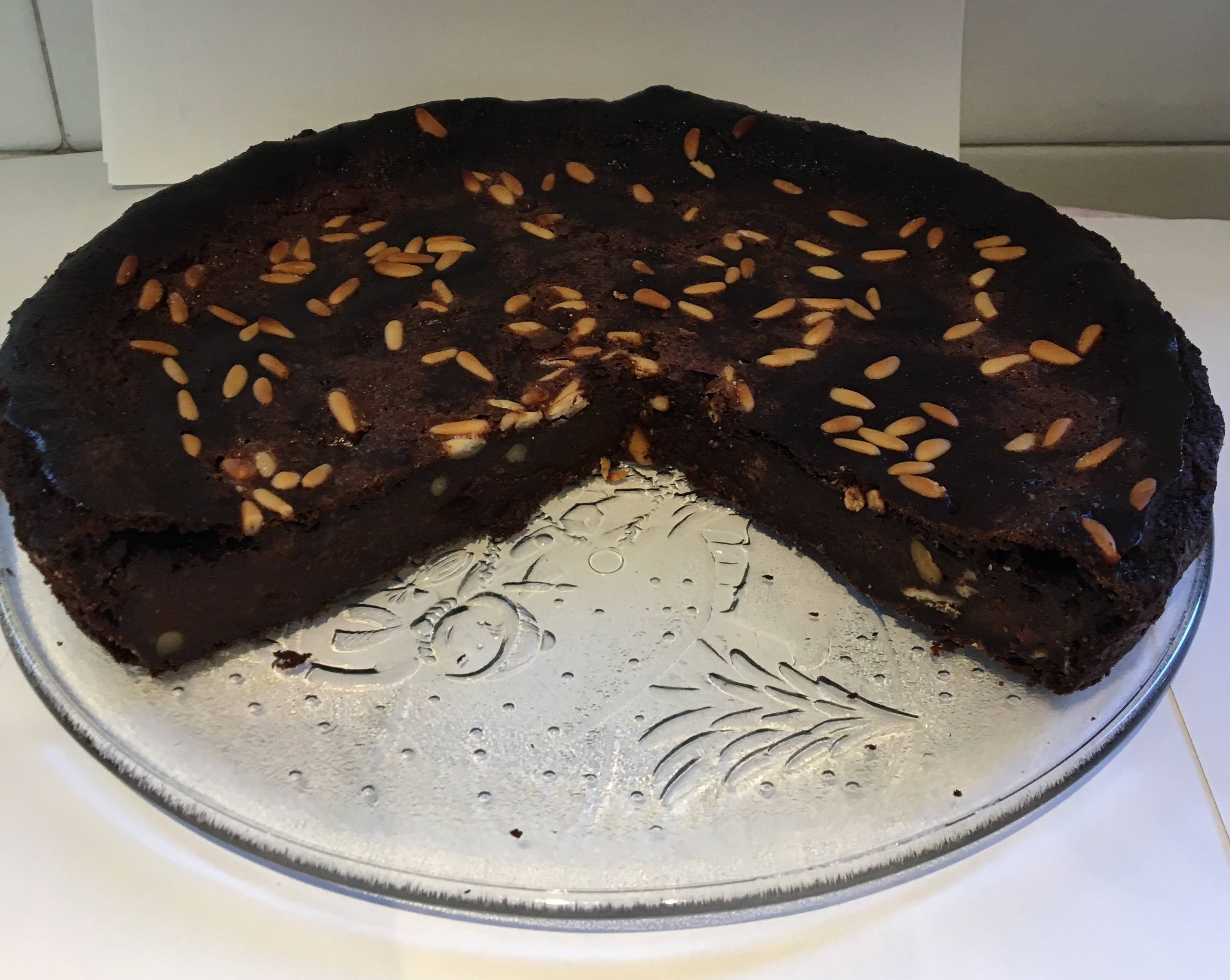
Chocolate torta paesana with raisins and pine nuts

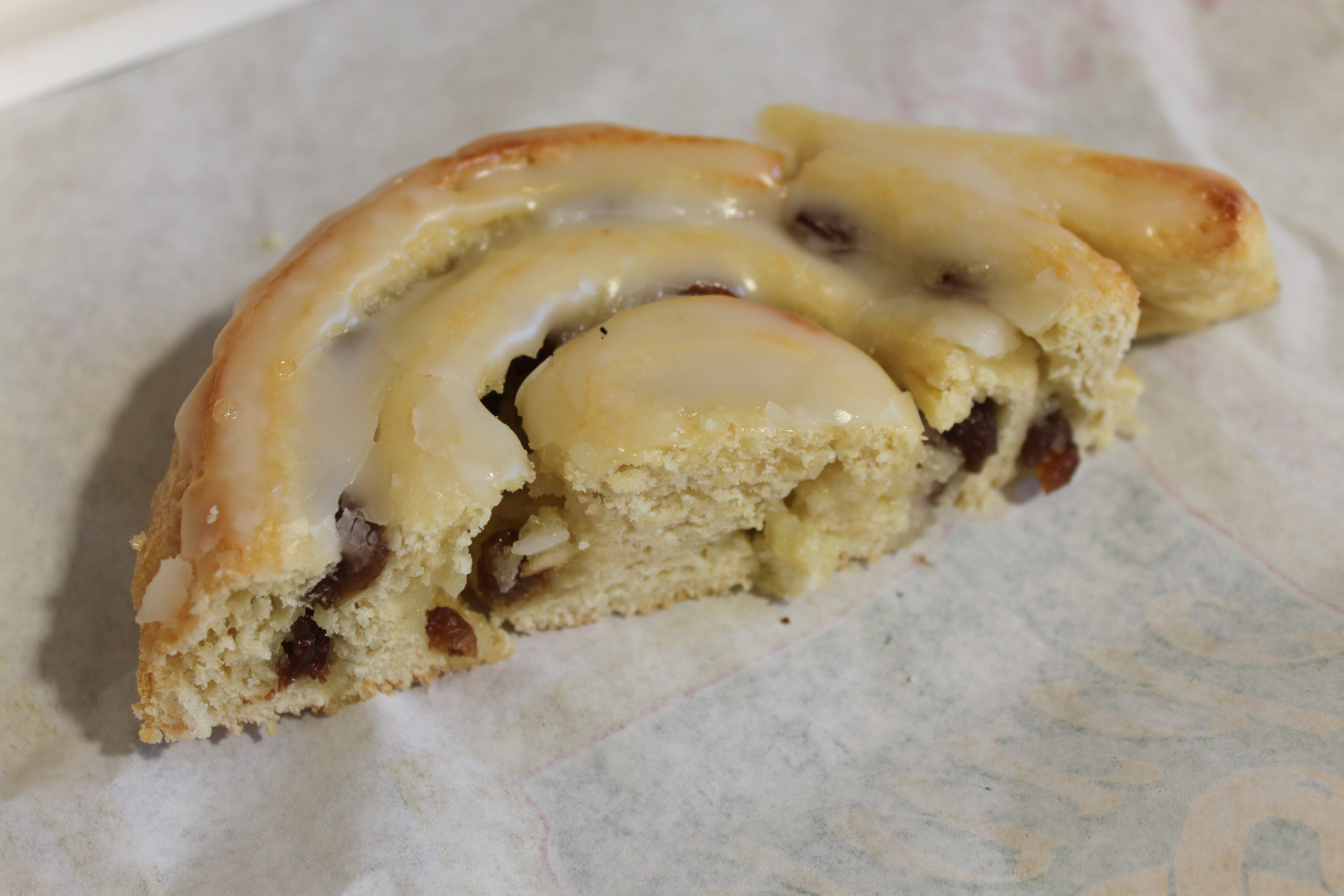
Raisin roll

== See also ==
- List of cakes
- List of raisin dishes and foods
- Panettone
- Plum cake
- Raisin bread
