= Bagharj =

Armenian bread

- Alternative names: Bagharch
- Type: Ritual bread
- Place of origin: Armenia
- Serving temperature: Warm or room temperature
- Main ingredients: Flour, water, yeast, salt or sugar, butter, sugar, eggs
- Variations: With or without salt; sweet (sugar dough) or plain

Bagharj (Armenian: բաղարջ, Armenian pronunciation: [bɑˈʁɑɾd͡ʒ]) is a traditional Armenian bread with both ritual and everyday uses. Depending on the recipe, it can be either salty, unsalted, or sweet. In Armenian folk culture, bagharj is attributed with symbolic and magical meanings.

== Description and preparation ==
Bagharj is a dense, flat, round bread. Its surface is typically decorated with patterns made using a sharp wooden tool, then brushed with egg and sprinkled with black nigella seeds, sesame, or poppy seeds. One variation is made from a rich dough with a high content of sugar and butter, which requires extended kneading and proofing.

The so-called "sugar dough" version of bagharj includes ingredients such as flour, sugar, butter, eggs, yeast, and salt. The dough is rolled into a flat round shape, decorated with shallow grooves, and bordered with twisted strips of dough, which are often topped with poppy seeds. Baking is typically done at a high temperature for 18–20 minutes.

== Ritual significance ==
Bagharj held important meaning in religious and seasonal rituals. On the Feast of Vardanants, pilgrims brought it to church and distributed it in remembrance of the event known as Bagharchakerats. On the Wednesday at the mid-point of Lent, bagharj was prepared. Baked inside was often a metal coin, which was revealed as the bread was portioned and given to those present. Receiving the coin was held to be lucky, and its reveal was eagerly anticipated. In spring, during the Tsaghkazard (Palm Sunday) celebration, it was consumed at cemeteries and shared as "bread of the soul" in honor of the sufferings of the apostles and martyrs.

The bread was also prepared in other settings — in watermills (where it was known as jaghatsi bagharj), as well as by shepherds in summer pastures. Some sources mention its use among Jewish communities during the celebration of Passover.

== Contemporary use ==
Today, bagharj continues to be baked both for festive occasions and as a part of daily Armenian cuisine.

== See also ==
- List of pastries
