= White raisins =

Variety of raisin

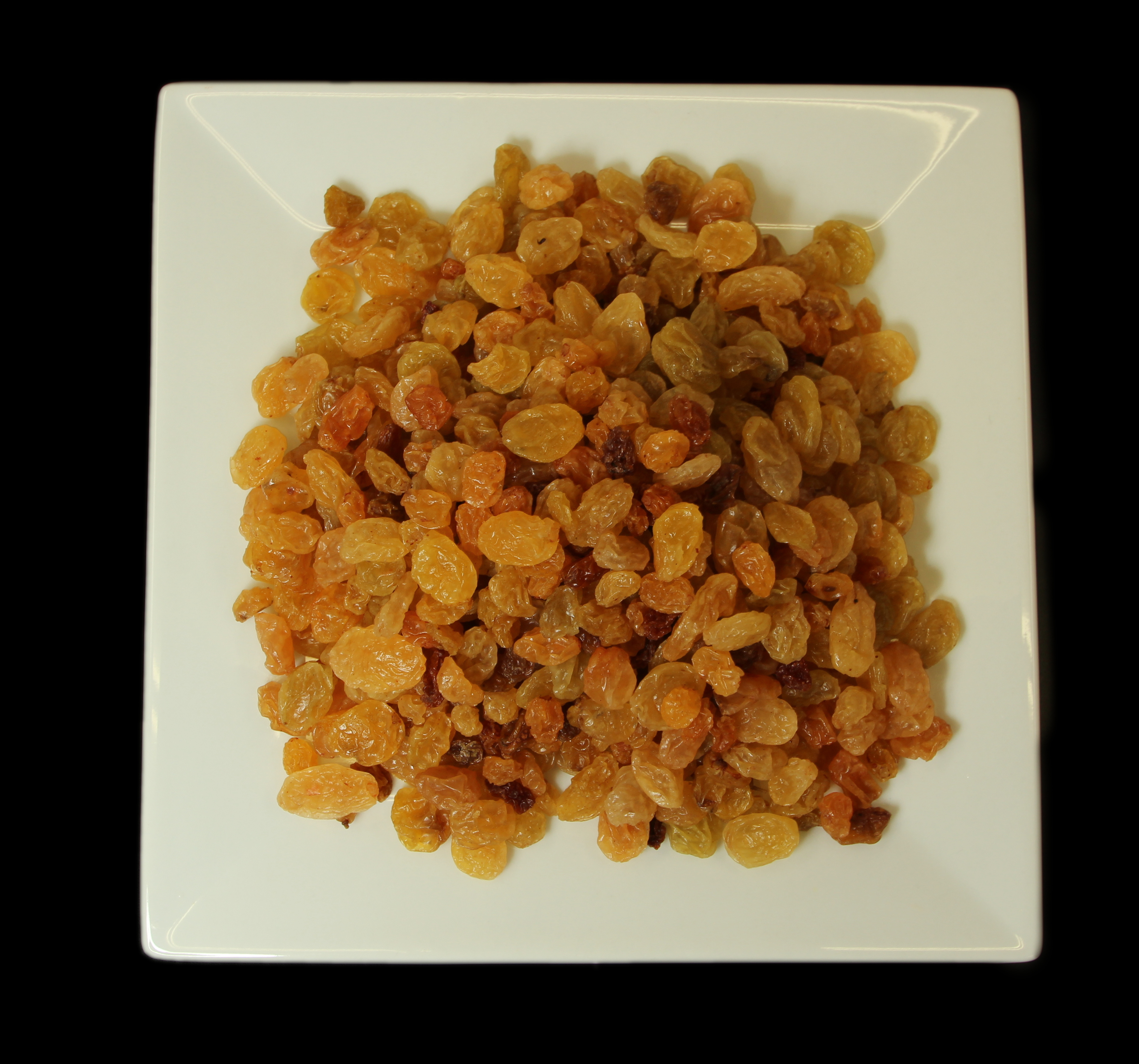
White raisins

White raisins are a variety of raisin that are white in colour. They are often called golden raisins or muscats. White raisins are oven dried unlike the typical sun-dried raisin. They can be eaten in place of "normal" raisins and are less sweet than sultanas. They are often used in baking such as in pies and with other fruits. The specific golden raisin variety was made popular by Paul Harvey, who in the 1990s told listeners about a folk remedy that when dipped in gin, they could help cure arthritis. No actual benefits have been found from consuming such a raisin.
