= Churchkhela =

Georgian candle-shaped nut candy

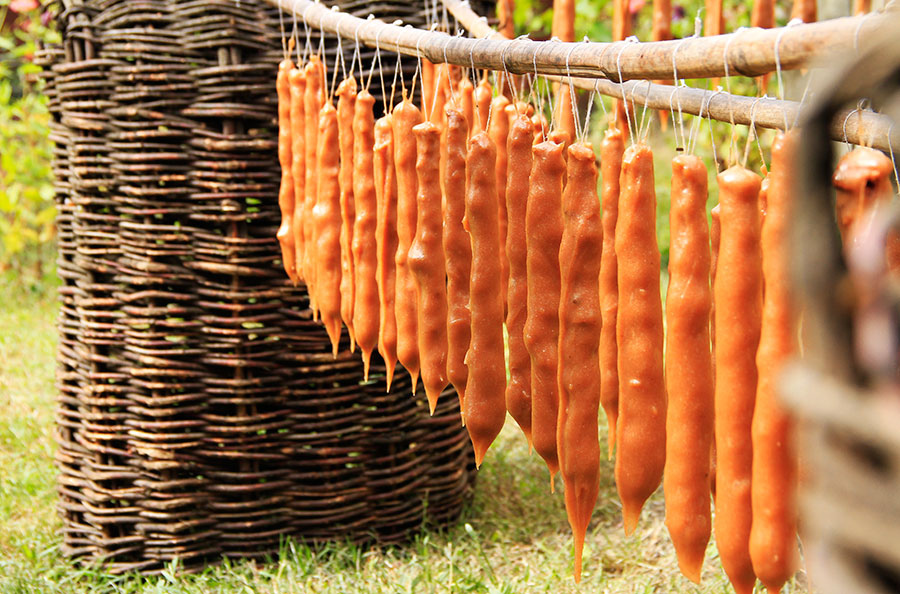
- Kakhetian churchela
- Alternative names: Churchela
- Type: Confectionery
- Place of origin: Georgia
- Main ingredients: Grape must, nuts, flour

Churchkhela (Georgian: ჩურჩხელა, romanized: churchkhela; CHURCH-kheh-LAH) is a traditional Georgian candle-shaped confection. The main ingredients of churchkhela are grape concentrate, nuts, and flour. The traditional technology of churchkhela in the Kakheti region was inscribed on the Intangible Cultural Heritage of Georgia list in 2015.

== Preparation ==
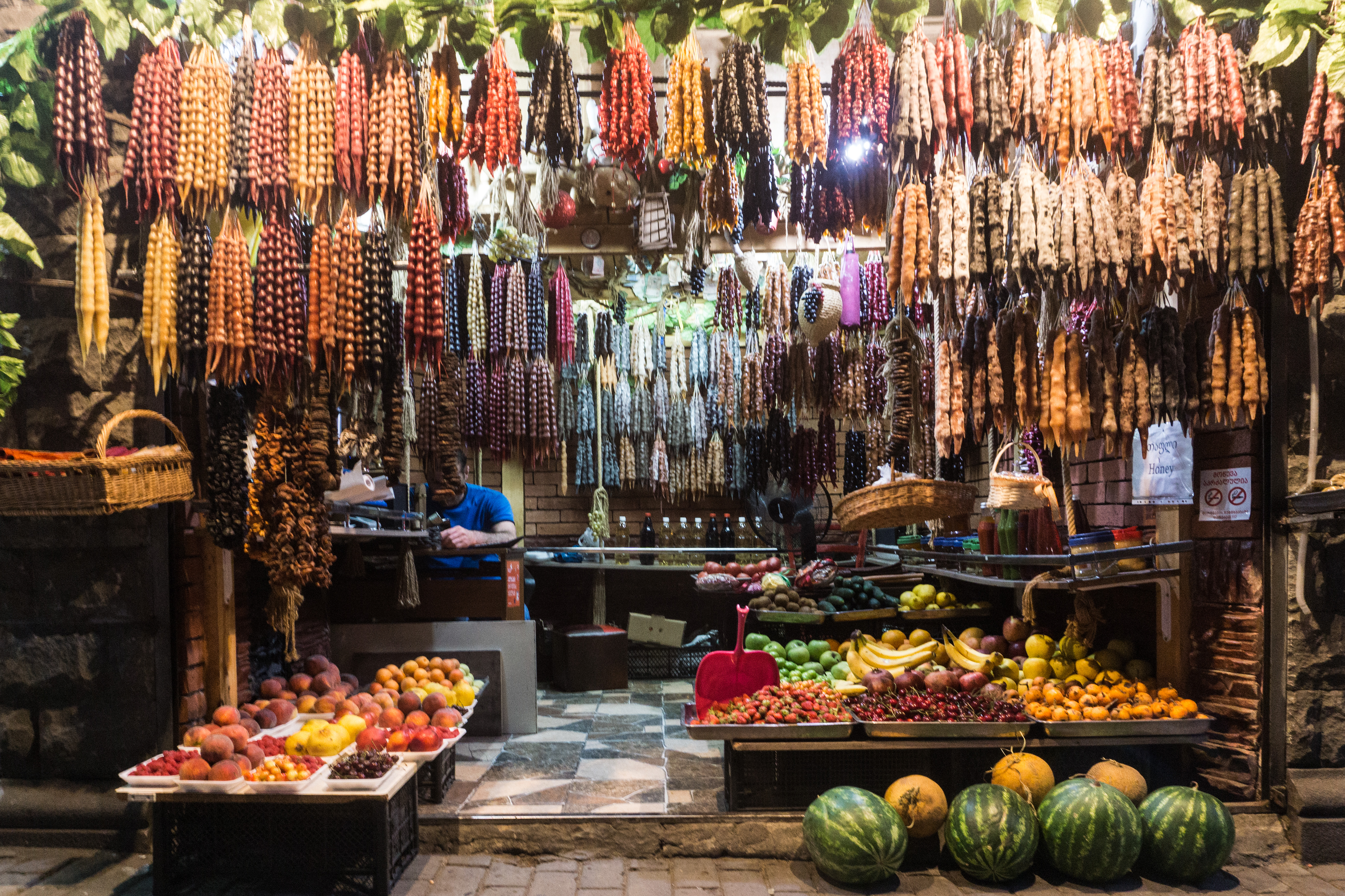
Churchkhelas on display at a Tbilisi shop

Most commonly, walnuts or hazelnuts are threaded onto a string, dipped in thickened grape concentrate (badagi), mulberry juice, or fruit juices and hung upside-down to dry in the shape of a candle. In eastern Georgia, churchkhela production begins with a condensed juice called tatara, made from juice from local grapes in the areas of Kakheti, Kartli, or Meskheti thickened and wheat flour added later. Wheat flour is also used for making condensed mulberry juice in the area of Samtskhe-Javakheti. Corn flour is used in western Georgia (the areas of Racha, Lechkhumi, Guria, Samegrelo, Abkhazia, and Achara), and this condensed grape juice is called pelamushi. In Abkhazia, a region in the North Caucasus Mountains of Georgia, it is known as Аджинджук (adzhindzhukhua or ajinjuk) in the local Abkhaz language and is touted as the best souvenir for gifting.

== Customs ==
- Churchkhela is a between-meal snack and is also served as a dessert during New Year and Christmas celebrations.
- Georgian soldiers carried churchkhela with them because they contain many calories.

== Illustration of the making process ==
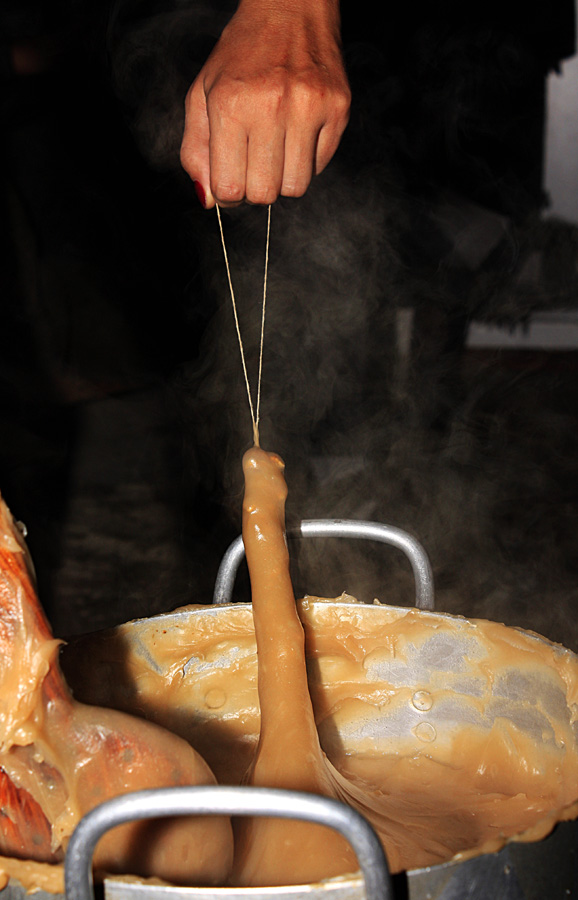
String of nuts being dipped in thickened grape must

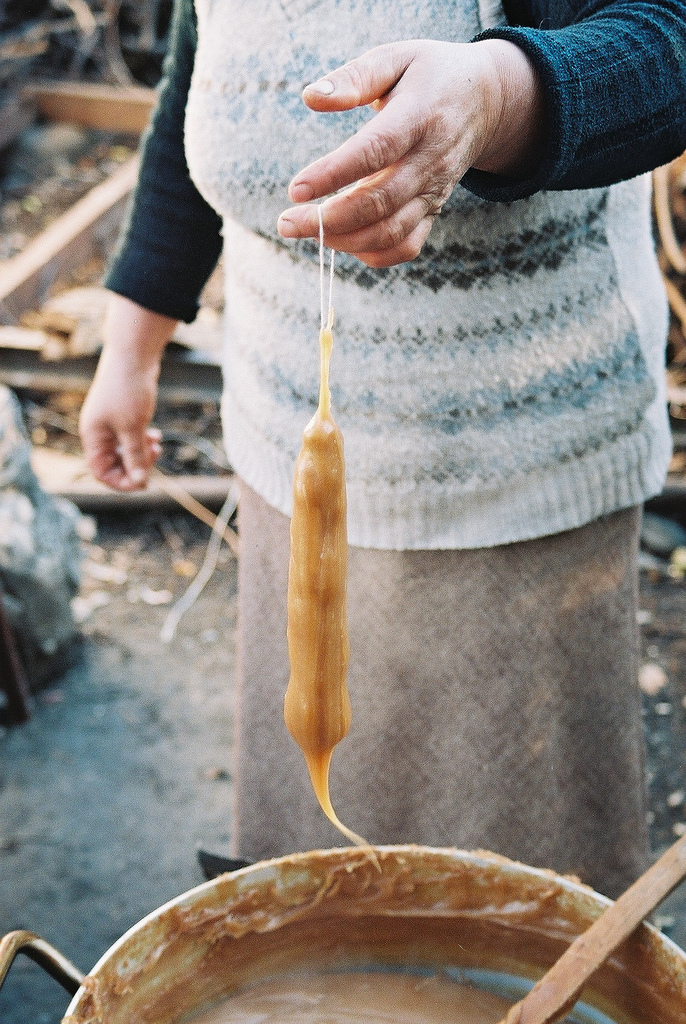
Once removed, it is ready to hang for air drying

== See also ==
- Gozinaki
- Sharots
- Walnut Sujuk
- List of grape dishes
