= Mikado cake =

Armenian layered cake

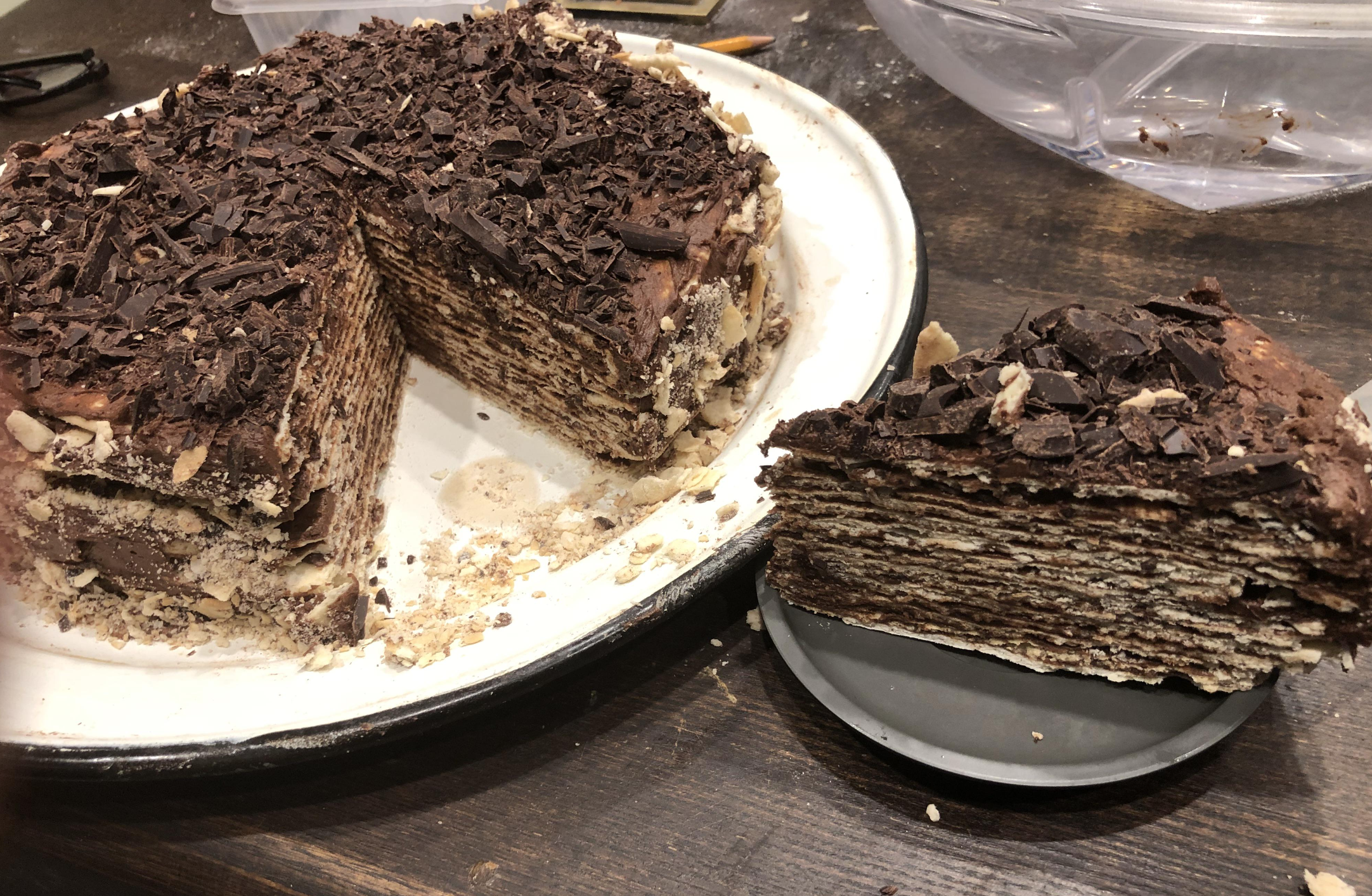
- Mikado cake prepared with roughly chopped chocolate
- Alternative names: Mikado
- Course: Dessert
- Place of origin: Armenia
- Associated cuisine: Armenian cuisine
- Serving temperature: Cold
- Main ingredients: Sponge cake, buttercream, condensed milk, cocoa powder

Mikado cake (Armenian: Միկադո տորթ), also known as Mikado, is an Armenian layered cake invented in the Armenian SSR and made with boiled condensed milk or dulce de leche buttercream, sour cream and topped with grated chocolate.

== See also ==
- List of desserts
- Armenian cuisine
- Esterhazy torte
- Dobos torte
