= Walnut stuffed figs =

Figs stuffed with nuts and more

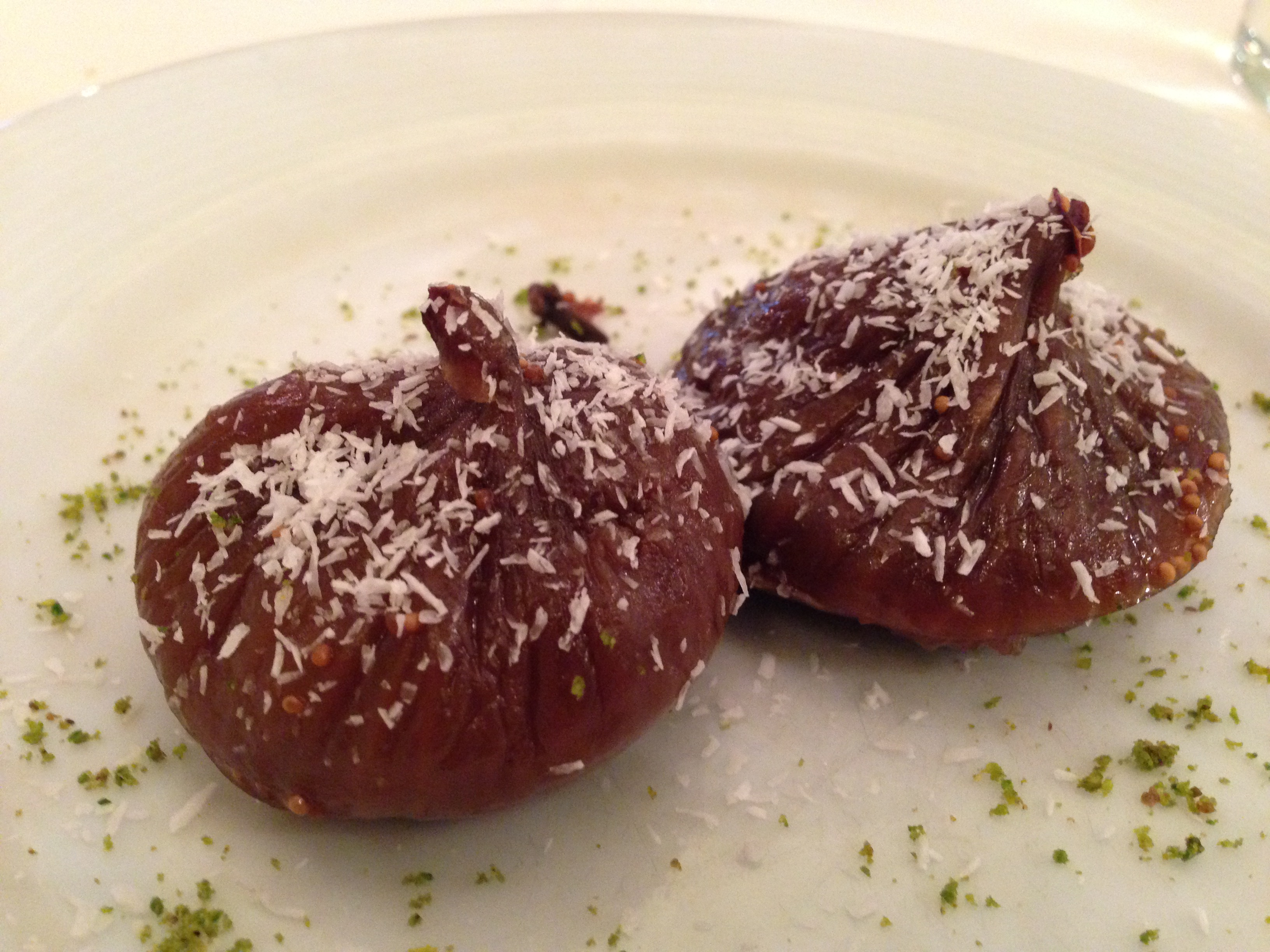
- Type: Dessert
- Place of origin: Armenia, Turkey

Walnut stuffed figs (Armenian: սալորի ալանի, "fig alani"; Turkish: Cevizli kuru incir tatlısı) is a type of Armenian and Turkish dessert. The ingredients are figs, warm water to soak the figs, walnuts, milk, sugar, and butter. For garnish crushed walnuts or coconut rasps can be used.

In Armenian, walnut stuffed figs are called "fig alani", as alani is a type of fruit-dessert in Armenian cuisine. As described here, it are fruits (in this case figs) that are stuffed with nuts and other fillings.

== See also ==
- Şekerpare
- Revani
- Baklava
- Tulumba
- Kabak tatlısı
