= Texas Reds Festival =

Street festival in Bryan, Texas

Coordinates: 30.6912°N 96.3747°W

Texas Reds Steak and Grape Festival Bryan, Texas

The Texas Reds Steak and Grape Festival was an annual outdoor event held in downtown Bryan, Texas each October from 2007 to 2019. The festival comprised culinary exhibitions, activities such as wine tasting and barbecue showcases, family-oriented events such as grape stomping, and live musical performances. As of 2021, the festival has been discontinued.

== History ==
Bryan hosted the inaugural Texas Reds Festival in 2007.

In 2008 Jerry Jeff Walker headlined the 2nd Annual event.

The 2009 event was attended by over 20,000 people from 18 different states and four countries. Robert Earl Keen, Jr. and Earl Thomas Conley played at the 2009 event

The 2017 event marked the 10 year anniversary of the festival. Attendants reported a positive experience, with 25 different vendors which participated.

As a result of the COVID-19 pandemic, Bryan City Council canceled the 2020 Texas Reds Festival.

In 2021, the Bryan City Council canceled the event consecutively. The 14th annual event was deferred to 2022. Later, Destination Bryan, a tourism and events organization based in Bryan, announced the indefinite discontinuation of the Texas Reds Festival. This decision was made in response to challenges related to substantial planning hours required to execute the festival and a noticeable decline in hotel bookings associated with the event.
