= Alani (dried fruit) =

Armenian dried fruit dessert

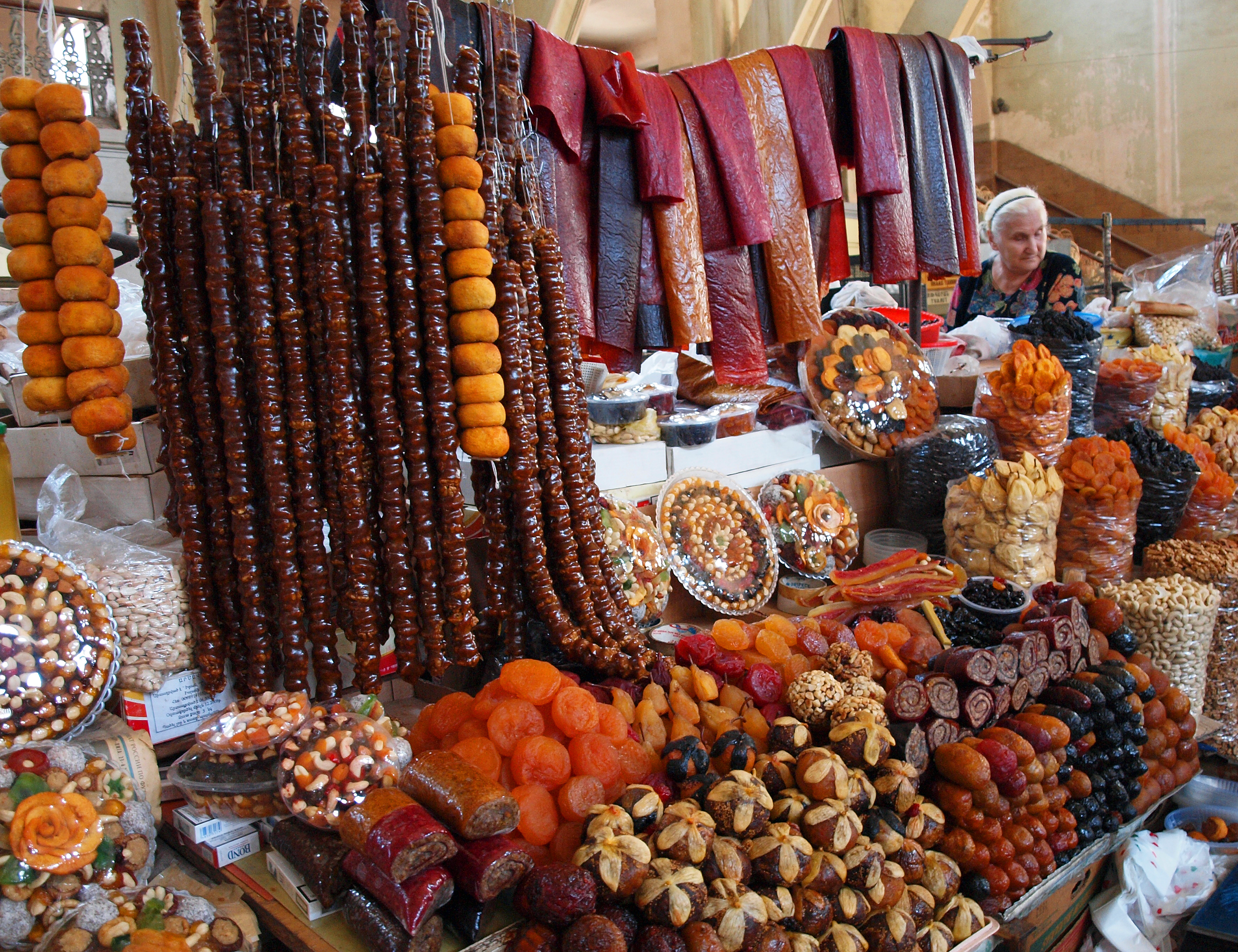
- Alani (top left) with other dried fruits at a market in Yerevan
- Type: Dried fruit confection
- Course: Dessert / Sweet
- Place of origin: Armenia
- Associated cuisine: Armenian cuisine
- Main ingredients: Peaches, walnuts, sugar, cinnamon, cardamom
- Variations: Can be made with figs instead of peaches

Alani (Armenian: ալանի, Armenian pronunciation: [ɑlɑˈni]) is a traditional Armenian sweet made from dried, pitted peaches filled with a mixture of ground walnuts, sugar, and spices such as cinnamon and cardamom. It is mainly found in the eastern regions of Armenia, particularly in the Gegharkunik Province.

== Description ==
Alani consists of peaches strung together on a thread and dried in the sun, with a walnut-based filling placed inside. In some variations, figs are used instead of peaches. The preparation involves several stages: peeling the peaches, fumigating them with sulfur, drying, removing the pits, stuffing with the nut mixture, and drying again.

According to the traditional recipe, for every 10 kg of peaches, the following ingredients are needed:

- 2.1 kg of walnut kernels
- 3.5 kg of sugar
- 20 g of cinnamon
- 20 g of cardamom
- 150 g of sulfur for fumigation

After the initial drying, the peaches are filled with the nut mixture, gently flattened, and strung on threads for final air-drying.

== Traditions and modernity ==
Alani is a seasonal delicacy typically prepared in late spring and early summer, during the peach harvest. Despite the increasing use of modern preservation methods such as freezing, alani remains a staple on local markets. However, traditional methods are gradually being replaced by faster, more industrial processes, threatening the preservation of original recipes and artisanal skills.

== In literature ==
Alani is mentioned in the third chapter of the historical novel Wounds of Armenia by Armenian author Khachatur Abovian:

Դեռ բարիկենդանի մաղեն, սուջուխ (չուչխել) ասես, ալանի, տանձ, խնձոր, փշատ, չիր՝ ջիբըներումն ունեին մեր տղերքը − հանեցին, երեխեքանցը բաժանեցին՝ աչքըները մնաց բաց, չունքի նրանց երկրումը էնպես արմաղան բաներ չկային

[Back during Barekendan, our boys had everything in their pockets—sujukh, alani, pears, apples, oleaster, dried fruits. They pulled them out and handed them to the children, who stared wide-eyed, since in their country, gifts like these simply didn't exist.]

— Khachatur Abovyan, Wounds of Armenia — Chapter Three (1858)

== See also ==
- Pastegh
- Sharots
