= Balsam (disambiguation) =

Balsam is a group of plant products derived from various plants.

Balsam may also refer to:

== Plants ==
- Balsaminaceae, the balsam family
  - Impatiens, a genus of the balsam family
- Abies balsamea, an evergreen tree commonly known as the balsam fir
  - Fraser fir, sometimes considered a subspecies and referred to as "she-balsam"
- Picea rubens, or red spruce, also called "he-balsam"

== People ==
- Artur Balsam (1906–1994), pianist
- Isaac Balsam (1880–1945), founder of the Balsam Dairy Farm
- Martin Balsam (1919–1996), actor
- Paul Balsam (1905–1972), New York Supreme Court Justice
- Philip Balsam (1943-2023), Canadian songwriter
- Talia Balsam (born 1959), American actress

== Places ==
- Balsam, Michigan, an unincorporated community
- The Balsams Grand Resort Hotel in Dixville Notch, New Hampshire
- Balsam, North Carolina, a town in the US
- Great Balsam Mountains of North Carolina
- Balsam Lake (Wisconsin), a lake in Wisconsin

== Other ==
- Balsam (drink), liqueur made with herbs
- Riga Black Balsam (Rīgas Melnais balzams), a traditional Latvian herbal liqueur
- Tincture of benzoin, also known as Friar's balsam

== See also ==
- Basamum
- Balm of Gilead
- Balsamic vinegar
- Balsam apple
- Balsam pear (disambiguation)
