= Balsamic vinegar of Modena =

Variety of balsamic vinegar

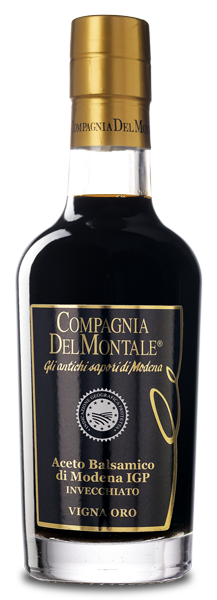
Balsamic vinegar of Modena

Balsamic vinegar of Modena (BVM; Italian: aceto balsamico di Modena, ABM) is a protected geographic indication variety of balsamic vinegar. It is produced according to various recipes. The PGI production regulations leave plenty of leeway, allowing the use of grape must (even if it is not from the provinces of Modena and Reggio Emilia) in percentages between 20 and 90% and wine vinegar between 10 and 80%. The use of caramel is allowed, up to 2%. Reading the tag can provide useful information on the ingredients used and the processing methods. Withdrawal and refilling, as used in making traditional balsamic vinegar, are not required; the ingredients, once mixed, must be kept in wood containers for a duration of at least 60 days. If the product is kept there for 3 years or more it is labeled "invecchiato" ('aged'). The balsamic vinegar of Modena gained the PGI label on 3 July 2009. The requirements for the much more expensive PDO Traditional Balsamic Vinegar are different and more restrictive; it must contain only grape must and be aged for at least 12 years.

== Standard ==
The standard for ABM is established as part of the PGI definition. Beyond those mentioned in the introduction, additional rules about the process and materials are:

- The grape must can only be derived from the following grape cultivars: Lambrusco, Sangiovese, Trebbiano, Albana, Ancellotta, Fortana, Montuni
- The grape must can be either cooked (as is traditional) or concentrated some other way.
- Vinegar that has been aged for at least 10 years also needs to be included in the product, though there is no minimum amount prescribed.
- The cooked/concentrated must needs to have an acidity of at least 8 g/L and a dry extract content of at least 55 g/L.
- The cooked/concentrated must shall have a minimum density of 1.240 at 20 °C.
- The following steps shall take place in the designated production zone (i.e. Modena and Reggio Emilia): assembly of raw materials, processing, refining and/or aging in wooden containers.
- Acetification should use one of these three methods: selected bacterial colonies; lenta in superficie (slow surface); lenta a truciolo (slow wood shavings).
- Acetification and aging shall be done in containers made of "fine wood". A non-exhaustive list is provided, including oak (especially rovere = sessile oak), chestnut, mulberry and juniper.

The final product should conform to the following specification:

- Appearance: clear and brilliant liquid with an intense brown color.
- Odor: characteristic, persistent, intense and delicate, pleasantly acetic, with possible woody notes.
- Flavor: sweet and sour, balanced, pleasant, characteristic.
- Analytical parameters:
  - Density ≥ 1.06 at 20 °C
  - Alcohol content by volume ≤ 1.5%
  - Net dry extract ≥ 30 g/L
  - Total acidity ≥ 6%
  - Sulfur dioxide ≤ 100 mg/L
  - Ash ≥ 2.5 parts per thousand
  - Reducing sugars ≥ 110 g/L

== Granting of PGI label ==
Upon submission of the application by Italy, Germany, and Greece raised the objection that the protection of the expression balsamic vinegar would have strongly damaged their national production, that has been legalized for five years. They emphasized that the words vinegar and balsamic, as generic terms, were not amenable to protection. They made known that they would have voted for the PGI label only in exchange for recognition of their right to use words balsamic vinegar by Italy. Also, France opposed, especially for the fact that the denomination "Balsamic Vinegar of Modena" would not have had a reputation distinct from that of the "Traditional Balsamic Vinegar of Modena", which would mislead the consumer.

After three years of disputes, on 3 July 2009, the European Commission put the balsamic vinegar of Modena in the register of protected geographical indications, with unanimous vote—apart from the "technical" abstention of France. Right after the protection of the EU in 2009, Greece tried to use a technical norm of the EU—unaware of the geographical protection procedures—to obtain recognition of the definition of "greek balsamic vinegar", confirming the attractiveness of a market which at the time was worth around 400 million Euros per year.

In 2019, the European Court of Justice reaffirmed that the individual terms of vinegar and balsamic are not protected.

== Consortia ==
In 1993 the Consorzio Tutela Aceto Balsamico di Modena was born, at the initiative of the largest and oldest manufacturers, for the valorization of the product, its defense, and diffusion worldwide. In 1998 the name was changed to Consorzio Aceto Balsamico di Modena, while keeping the statute unchanged. The consortium mark has been used since January 1999.

The Consorzio Filiera Aceto Balsamico di Modena name adopted in 2010 from the Consorzio Produzione Certificata Aceto Balsamico di Modena brought together some of the biggest producers.

In 2013 those two Consortia joined to form the Consorzio Tutela Aceto Balsamico di Modena.

Lastly, between the enforcement and promotion bodies, there's the Comitato Produttori Indipendenti Aceto Balsamico di Modena, that together with the other two consortia was the promoter of the recognition request of the PGI by the European Union.

=== Consortium Profile ===
The Consorzio Tutela Aceto Balsamico di Modena has produced a simple labeling system to describe the taste and structure of an ABM. The label describes the body (corpo) of the vinegar in five segments, from the most tangy (agro) to the sweetest (dolce). Each level comes with specific requirements for density, total dry extract content, and net dry extract content. For vinegars that have been barrel-aged for more than three years, an "aged" (invecchiato) label may be added. The labeling system may only be used by producers that participate in the consortium.

Segments defined in the Consortium Profile
Class	Density	Net dry extract (g/L)	Total dry extract (g/L)
1	1.060–1.089	30–50	135–220
2	1.090–1.119	35–65	210–295
3	1.120–1.149	40–80	285–380
4	1.150–1.249	45–115	360–690
5	> 1.25	> 60	> 620

Note: total dry extract = net dry extract + reducing sugar content, all units in g/L.

Each level is associated with its own sensory profile and recommended uses.

== Quality check ==
The independent certification body is directly nominated by the Ministry of Agricultural, Food and Forestry Policies and it has the task of verifying compliance with the del Disciplinary of Production throughout the production process and the validity of the organoleptic properties of the balsamic vinegar before it is put on the market. Each lot intended for bottling (reserved only to authorized and certified centers) must meet the respect of the Disciplinary of Production.

== See also ==
Media related to Aceto balsamico di Modena at Wikimedia Commons

- Balsamic vinegar
- Traditional balsamic vinegar
