= Balsamic vinegar =

Type of vinegar originating in Italy

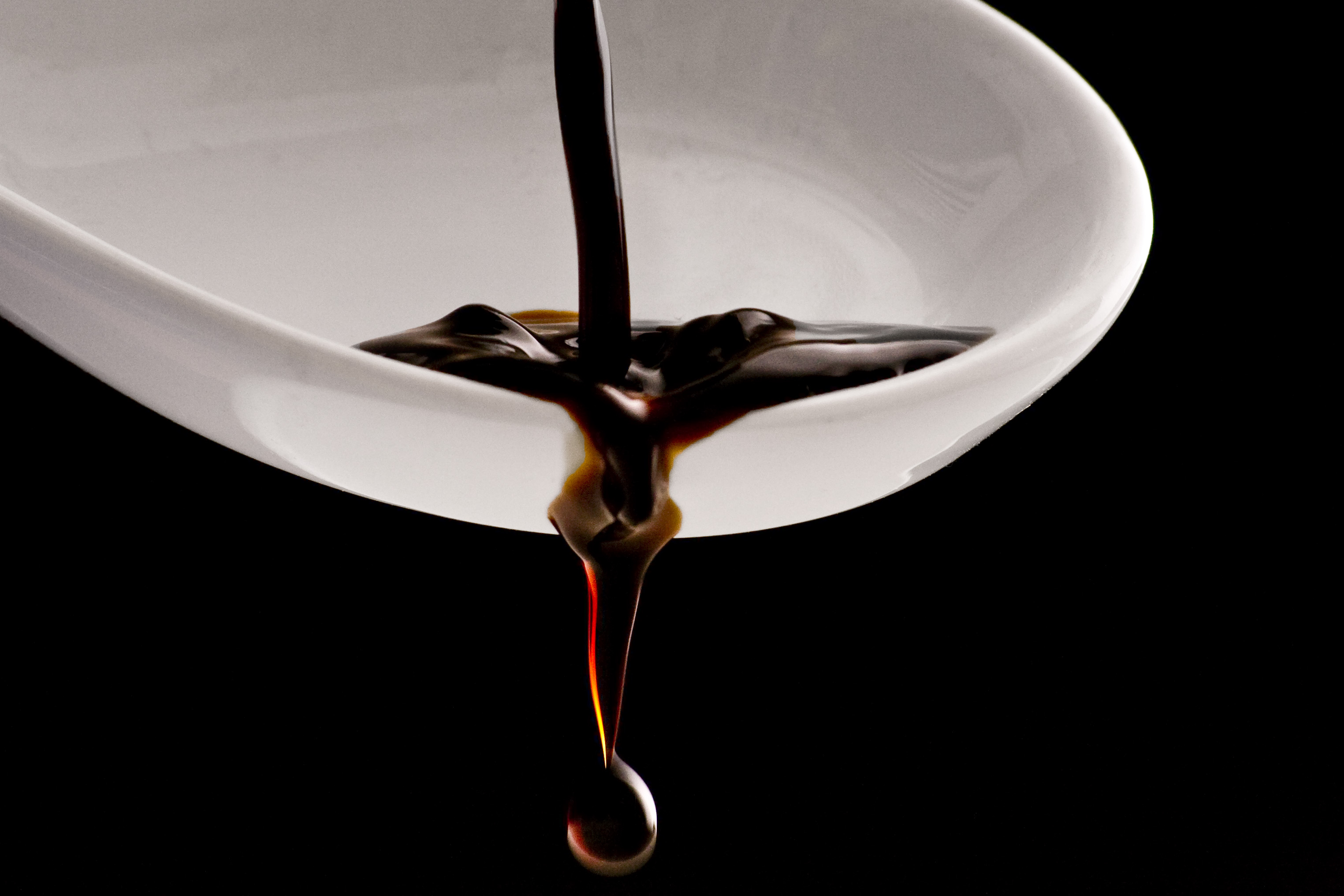
- Drops of balsamic vinegar
- Type: Condiment and salad dressing
- Place of origin: Italy
- Region or state: Modena and Reggio Emilia, Emilia-Romagna
- Main ingredients: White Trebbiano grape juice, Lambrusco grape must

Balsamic vinegar (Italian: aceto balsamico) is a dark, concentrated, pungent, intensely flavoured vinegar made wholly or partially from grape must, which is freshly crushed grape juice with all the skins, seeds, and stems. It has been used over centuries in Mediterranean cuisines of Southern Europe. Three types of balsamic vinegar are "protected" as traditional vinegars in Europe.

Originating in Emilia-Romagna and considered a staple condiment in Italian cuisine, balsamic vinegar adds sweet tangy flavor in preparation of seafood, meat marinades, roasted vegetables, and as salad dressing.

== Etymology ==
"Balsamic" means "like balsam", which denotes aromatic and supposed healing properties. Likewise, the Italian word balsamico (from Latin balsamum, from Greek βάλσαμον, bálsamon) means "balsam-like" in the sense of "restorative" or "curative"; cf. English 'balm'. Ultimately from Ancient Hebrew-Phoenician בשׂם (bāśām or besem, IPA [baːˈɬaːm]), the name means "perfume or spice", with the consonant sequence of the letter 'λ' and 'σ' deriving from Ancient Greek to pronounce the שׂ (ś) sound, sounding back then as [ɬ].

== History ==
The practice of cooking grapes can be traced back to ancient Roman times, where it was valued both as a folk medicine remedy and a sweetener or condiment in cooking. The story of balsamic vinegar began in the 11th century in the city of Modena; by 1046, it was already gaining a wider reputation. The future Holy Roman Emperor, King Henry III, requested Marquis Bonifacio of Canossa to craft a high quality vinegar in his castle.

Balsamic vinegar was historically used as a medicine for various illnesses: "an effective remedy for sore throat, fainting spells, as an energy-producing beverage, as a tonic for the heart, and for other therapeutic uses". Ludovico Antonio Muratori described medicinal properties in his treatise Del governo della peste e delle maniere di guardasene ("On the governing of the pestilence and some manners of guarding against it").

Historically, in the area of Modena and Reggio, the vinegars produced in the houses were made more pleasant by flavouring them with herbs, liquorice, rosemary, roses, vanilla, or by producing them with different raw materials (trebbiano, moscato, etc.) or procedures, creating over the centuries a widespread fame for "Modena-style vinegars".

The first use of the term was in a catalogue of wines held by the duke of Este in 1747, to distinguish a particular type from others present in the palace. In 1830, this definition was further refined, so that the vinegars present at the court were divided into "balsamic", "semi-balsamic", "fine", and "common". The earliest surviving recipe for balsamic vinegar is in a letter by Francesco Aggazzotti in 1860 or 1862, where he describes it as "Modena vinegar".

From a regulatory point of view, the first ministerial authorization to produce "balsamic vinegar of Modena" dates back to 1933. After World War II, the economic boom led some producers, such as Telesforo Fini and the Monari-Federzoni family, to market a different product under the name "balsamic vinegar", which was a mix with wine vinegar for daily use. This made balsamic vinegar common on Italian tables and began its spread to foreign countries. In 1965, further regulations on the use of the term "balsamic vinegar" were established, and the first production regulations for "balsamic vinegar of Modena" were created. In 1976, to distinguish traditional production methods from industrial ones, the term "natural" balsamic vinegar was adopted, later changed to "traditional" due to legislative requirements.

== European protection ==
The term aceto balsamico is unregulated, but there are three protected types of balsamic vinegar:

- Aceto Balsamico Tradizionale di Modena PDO (traditional balsamic vinegar of Modena)
- Aceto Balsamico Tradizionale di Reggio Emilia PDO (traditional balsamic vinegar of Reggio Emilia)
- Aceto Balsamico di Modena PGI (balsamic vinegar of Modena)

Many products contain Aceto Balsamico di Modena IGP as an ingredient, such as glazes and other condiments.

=== Traditional balsamic vinegar ===
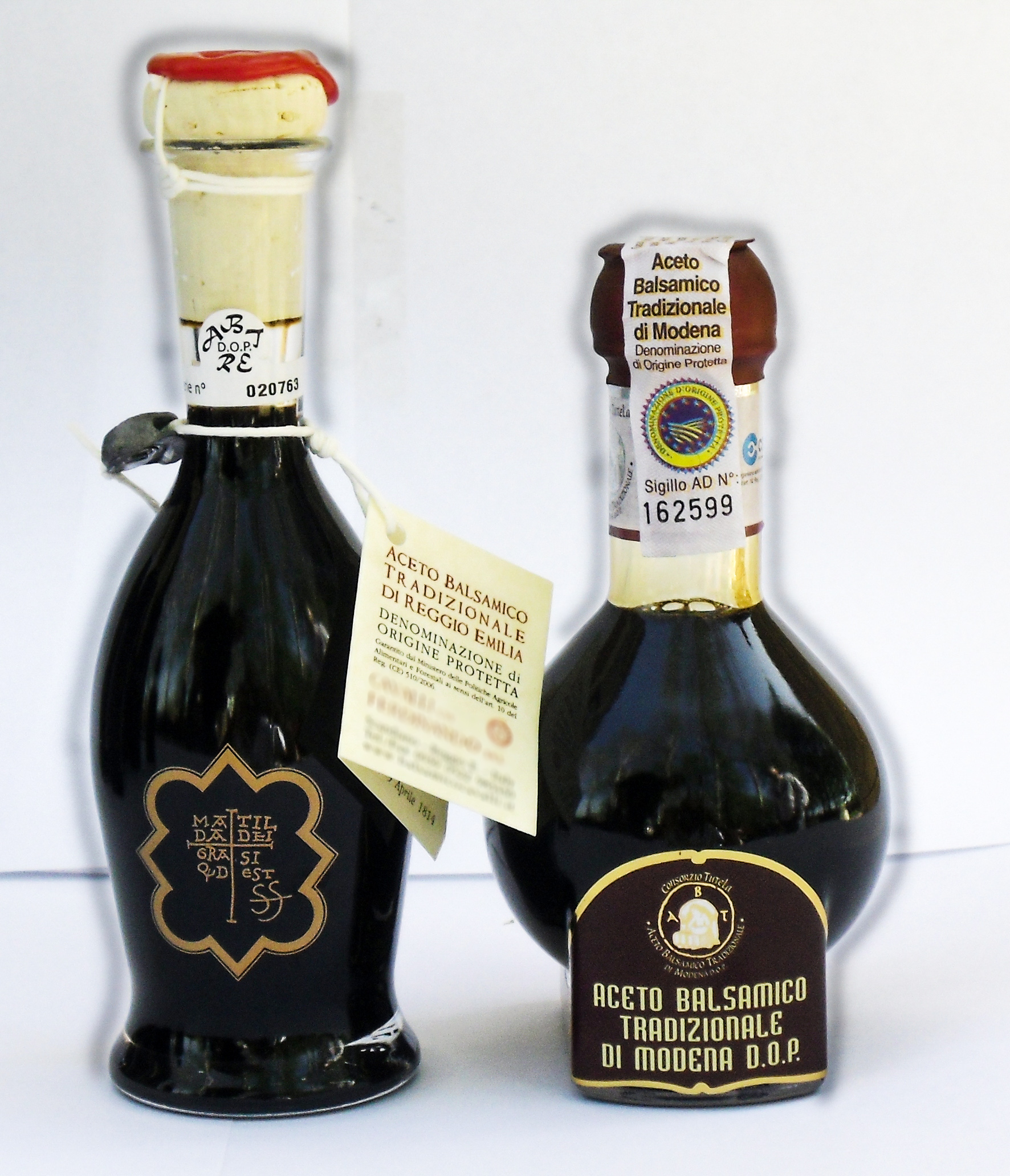
The two Italian traditional balsamic vinegars from Reggio Emilia (left) and Modena (right) with protected designation of origin status (PDO), in their legally approved shaped bottles

Only two locations produce balsamic vinegar protected by legal status: Modena and neighbouring Reggio Emilia. Balsamic vinegar in these places is subject to a denominazione di origine controllata (a designation often used for wine) which requires production in these regions. The original standard defining traditional balsamic vinegar, aceto balsamico tradizionale, was created in 1986. In 2000, criteria were established for protected designation of origin, a European Union standard.

True balsamic vinegar is made from a reduction of pressed Trebbiano di Castelvetro grapes. The resulting thick syrup, sapa or saba, is subsequently aged in a battery of several barrels of successively smaller sizes.

The casks are made of different woods such as chestnut, cherry, oak, mulberry, ash, and juniper. True balsamic vinegar is rich, glossy, deep brown, and has a complex flavour that balances the natural sweet and sour elements of the cooked grape juice with hints of wood from the casks.

Reggio Emilia designates the different ages of their balsamic vinegar (aceto balsamico tradizionale di Reggio Emilia) by label colour. A red label means the vinegar has been aged for at least 12 years, a silver label that the vinegar has aged for at least 18 years, and a gold label designates that the vinegar has aged for 25 years or more.

Modena uses a different system to indicate the age of its balsamic vinegars (aceto balsamico tradizionale di Modena). A white-coloured cap means the vinegar has aged for at least 12 years and a gold cap bearing the designation extravecchio ('extra-old') shows the vinegar has aged for 25 years or more.

=== Balsamic vinegar of Modena ===
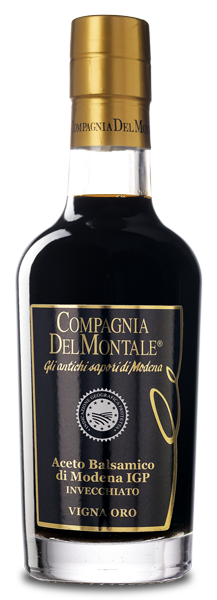
Aged balsamic vinegar of Modena PGI (three years)

These commercial-grade products imitate the traditional product. The current standard is found as part of the register of PGI productions, under the name Balsamic Vinegar of Modena (aceto balsamico di Modena). It was added to the PGI list in 2009.

They are made of as little as 20% grape must (and not necessarily from Modena or Reggio Emilia), with the addition of wine vinegar (at least 10%), and caramel (at most 2%) to stabilize the color. PGI status requires a minimum aging period of two months in wooden barrels, rising to three years when labelled as invecchiato ('aged'). The standard mandates a number of acceptable cultivars (Lambrusco, Sangiovese, Trebbiano, Albana, Ancellotta, Fortana, Montuni) for making grape must. The must can either be cooked or concentrated some other way. Vinegar that has been aged for at least 10 years also needs to be included in the product, though there is no minimum amount prescribed.

As the manufacturing process is highly industrialized, the output of a medium-sized producer may be hundreds of litres per day.

=== Italian condimenti that used the term balsamic ===
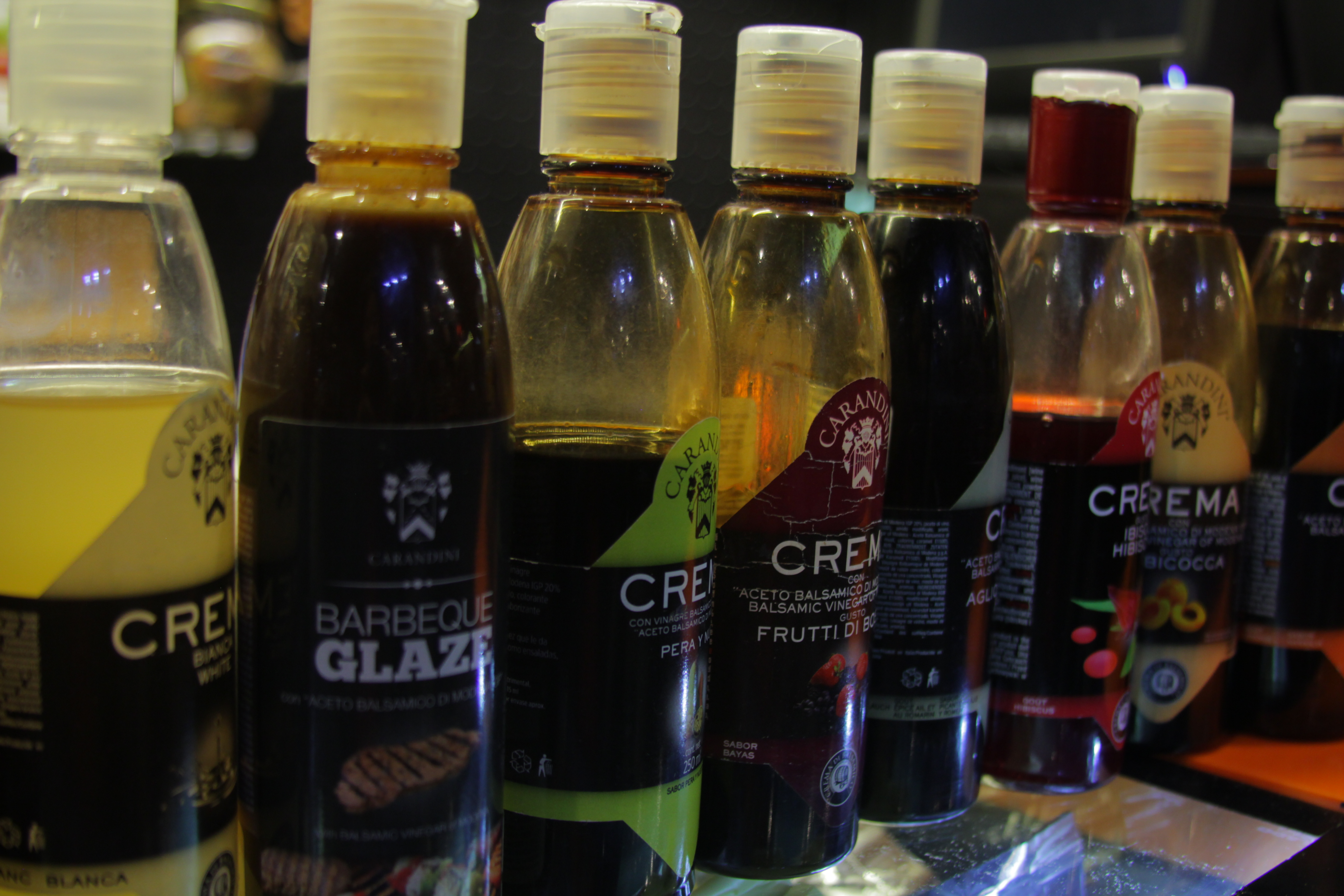
Italian "Carandini" brand balsamic glaze with the PGI, sold in Mexico

Condimento ('dressing') balsamic vinegars may be labeled as condimento balsamico, salsa balsamica or salsa di mosto cotto. For those products, there is a risk of creating confusion among consumers looking for the original Balsamic Vinegar of Modena PGI, the two different Traditional Balsamic Vinegar of Modena PDO, and Traditional Balsamic Vinegar of Reggio Emilia PDO.

Condimento balsamic vinegar may be made in any of the following ways:

- Made by producers of both Balsamic Vinegar of Modena PGI or Traditional Balsamic Vinegar of Modena/Reggio Emilia PDO, by using the PGI or PDO as an ingredient. For those products, the use of the PGI and PDO as an ingredient must be clearly reported, i.e. "glaze with Aceto Balsamico di Modena IGP". The Consortium must approve the label and the use of the PGI's/PDO's name.
  - A common product is a "balsamic glaze", with added sweetener and thickener to artificially simulate the sweetness and thickness of the aged aceto balsamico tradizionale di Modena.
- Made by the same method as the vinegars, but by Italian producers outside Modena and Reggio Emilia provinces and not made under consortium supervision. No reference to the PDO/PGI can be made for those products, and they cannot use the geographical names Modena or Reggio Emilia.

As there are no official standards or labeling systems to designate condimento balsamic vinegar, it can be hard to tell their quality based on the packaging alone.

=== Comparison ===
From a legal point of view, TBV is categorized as a "food condiment", while BVM is a "wine vinegar". BVM can be produced without a lengthy aging period, whereas TBV gains its particular features during a long aging period fixed by law at no less than 12 years. TBV is the only condiment in the world produced starting from cooked grape musts without the addition of other substances, whereas BVM is a blend of concentrated grape musts, wine vinegars, and caramel (optional).

	Traditional balsamic vinegar	Balsamic vinegar of Modena	Thickened balsamic condimenti
Production
Starting materials	Cooked must from grapes harvested in Modena or Reggio Emilia provinces of permitted vine cultivars. Must cannot be sulphitated.	Concentrated grape musts, wine vinegar and optional caramel (max 2% w/w) – the basis of vineyards ampelographic is imposed by law, but the permitted vines can grow outside the Modena province. Concentration can be done by cooking or another method. Must may be sulphitated, with a maximum amount of residual sulfite specified.	Commonly contains starting materials similar to BVM, with added thickeners such as modified or native starch, glucose/fructose syrup, pectins, guar gum, xanthan, carob seed, etc.
Making procedure	Alcoholic fermentation of sugars, acetic oxidation, aging period inside a set of wooden casks, refilling procedure throughout the years, annual withdrawal and bottling. The overall procedure is carried out on a small scale.	Mix of the starting materials, facultative maturation in an unspecified number of wooden containers, and bottling. The overall procedure is carried out on an industrial scale.	Mix of the starting materials and packaging. The procedure is carried out at industrial scale.
Legal aging	The residence time of the product inside the set of barrels is determined by the refilling and withdrawing procedure. The minimum aging time is no less than 12 years.	The minimum aging time is no less than 60 days.	No minimum limit for aging.
Distribution
Bottling	The product is sealed inside the patented 100 mL glass bottle	The product is sealed inside various types of bottles (minimum 250 mL of capacity) or single-dose plastic packages (maximum 25 mL)	The product is sealed inside various types of packages of different capacity
Pricing	Ranging between 40 and 250 euros	Ranging between 2 and 40 euros	Ranging between 2 and 350 euros
Characteristics
Minimum density	TBVM 1.24 g/mL – TBVRE 1.20 g/mL The relatively high density is the result of the water evaporation during the long aging period.	1.06 g/mL – Higher density values depend on the degree of grape must concentration.	Not required: Higher density values are possible as a function of recipes.
Minimum of total acidity	TBVM 4.5 g/100 g – TBVRE 5 g/100 g of acetic acid equivalent, the acetic acid is biologically produced in the early stages of making procedure, then it concentrates during aging.	6 g/100 g of acetic acid equivalent. The acetic acid comes from both the starting ingredients or from aging (a wide range of must-to-vinegar ratios are admissible).	Not required
Colour	Dark brown, limpid and bright, color is determined by nonenzymatic browning reaction of sugars starting on grape must cooking stage and progressing during aging.	Dark brown, limpid and bright, brown colour can be enhanced by added caramel (E150d)	Dark brown, limpid and bright, brown colour can be enhanced by added caramel (E150d)
Viscosity	The viscosity of TBV is mainly affected by the amount of the high molecular weight melanoidin, a heterogeneous class of biopolymers that form and accumulate during the ageing process.	Viscosity is lower than TBV ones, although it can be enhanced by adding caramel.	The flow properties are very similar to the TBV ones, but they originate from the adding of thickeners.
Sensory evaluation	It is a prerequisite for their commercialization. Sensory panels are long-time, trained judges, but sensory procedures are not standardized, often leading to irreproducible scores.	Sensory characteristics defined in standard. Evaluation procedure not specified.	Not required

Note: there is no standard for condimenti thickened to emulate TBV. As a result, the characteristics provided here are typical rather than required.

=== Non-Italian balsamic vinegars ===
Non-Italian producers may produce products made by the same method as the vinegars, not made under consortium supervision. No reference to the PDO/PGI can be made for those products, and they cannot use the geographical names Modena or Reggio Emilia. However, because they are made outside of Italy, they are free to use the term "balsamic vinegar".

Inside the European Union, Germany and Greece both have established productions of balsamic vinegars. As a result, they opposed the original application of balsamic vinegar of Modena IGP until it was clarified that they will still be allowed to use the term "balsamic vinegar". Greece also tried unsuccessfully to obtain a geographic indication of their local balsamic vinegar after the acceptance of the IGP. In 2019, the European Court of Justice confirmed the protection on the PGI does not extend to the individual words of balsamico and aceto. As a result, producers in these countries remain free to use the words, so long as the product does not deceive the customer as to the origin of the product when the name is taken as a whole.

Non-Italian balsamic vinegars

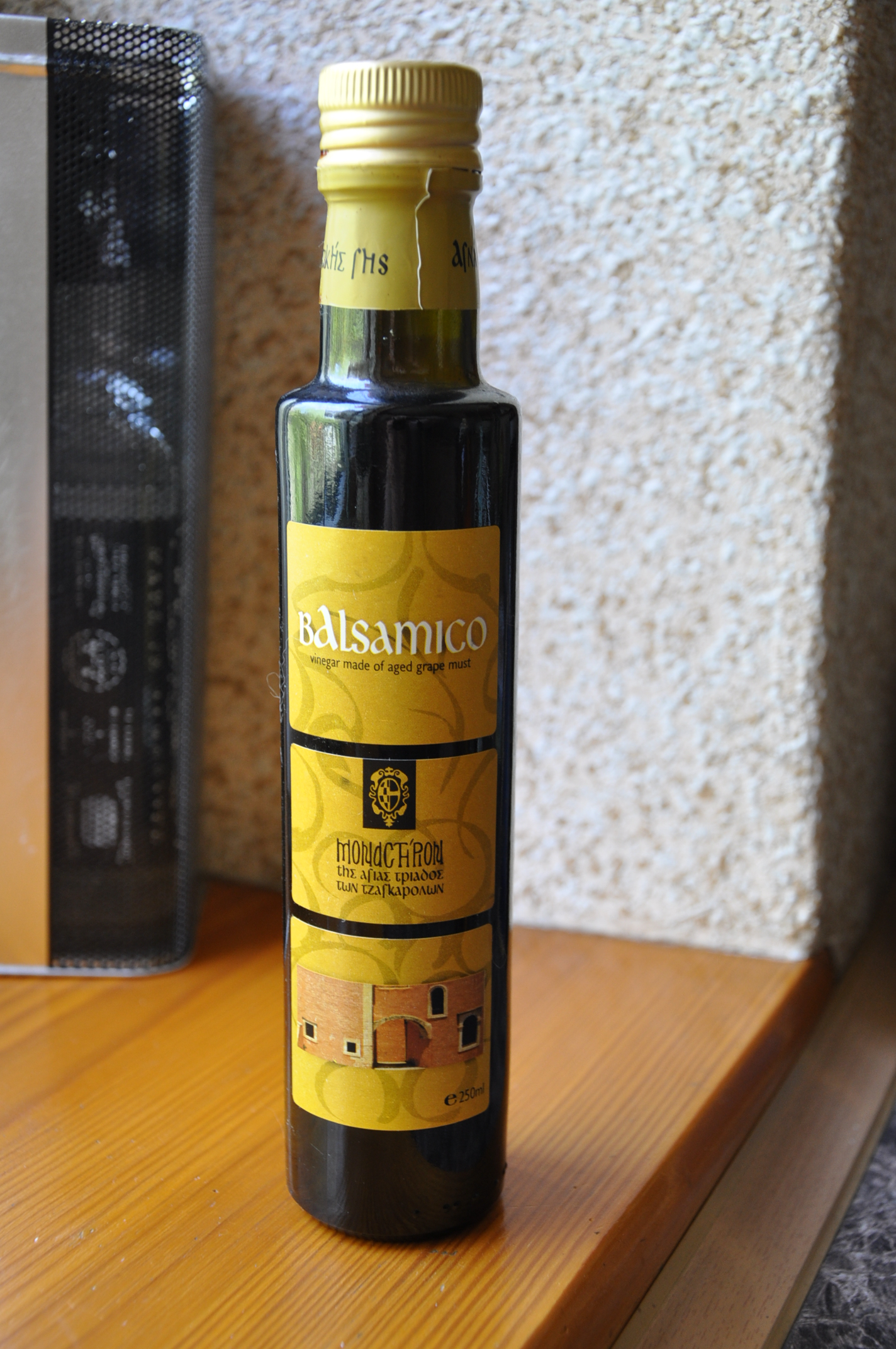
A Greek balsamic vinegar made at Agia Triada Monastery from aged must

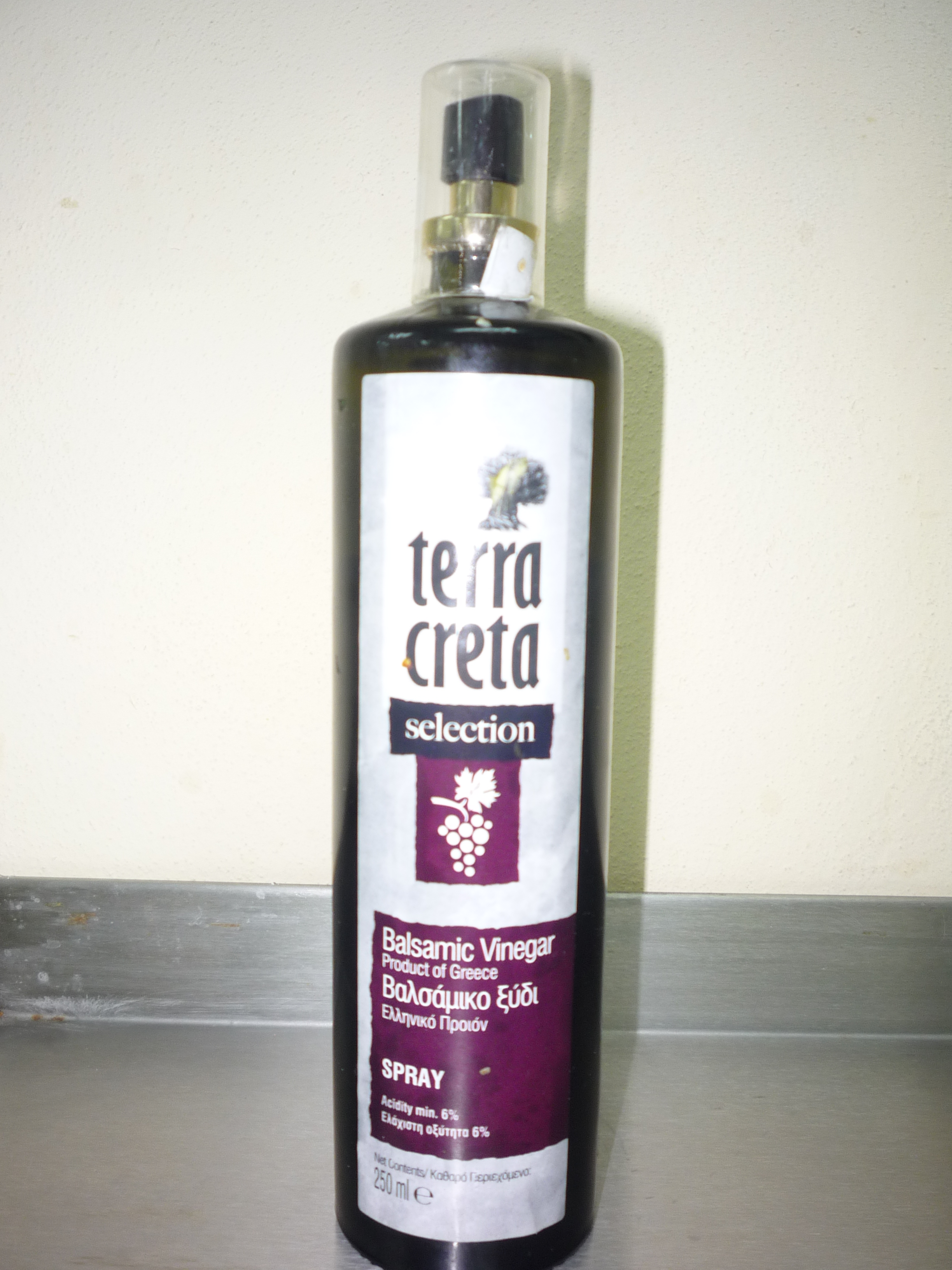
Another Greek vinegar sold in the Czech Republic

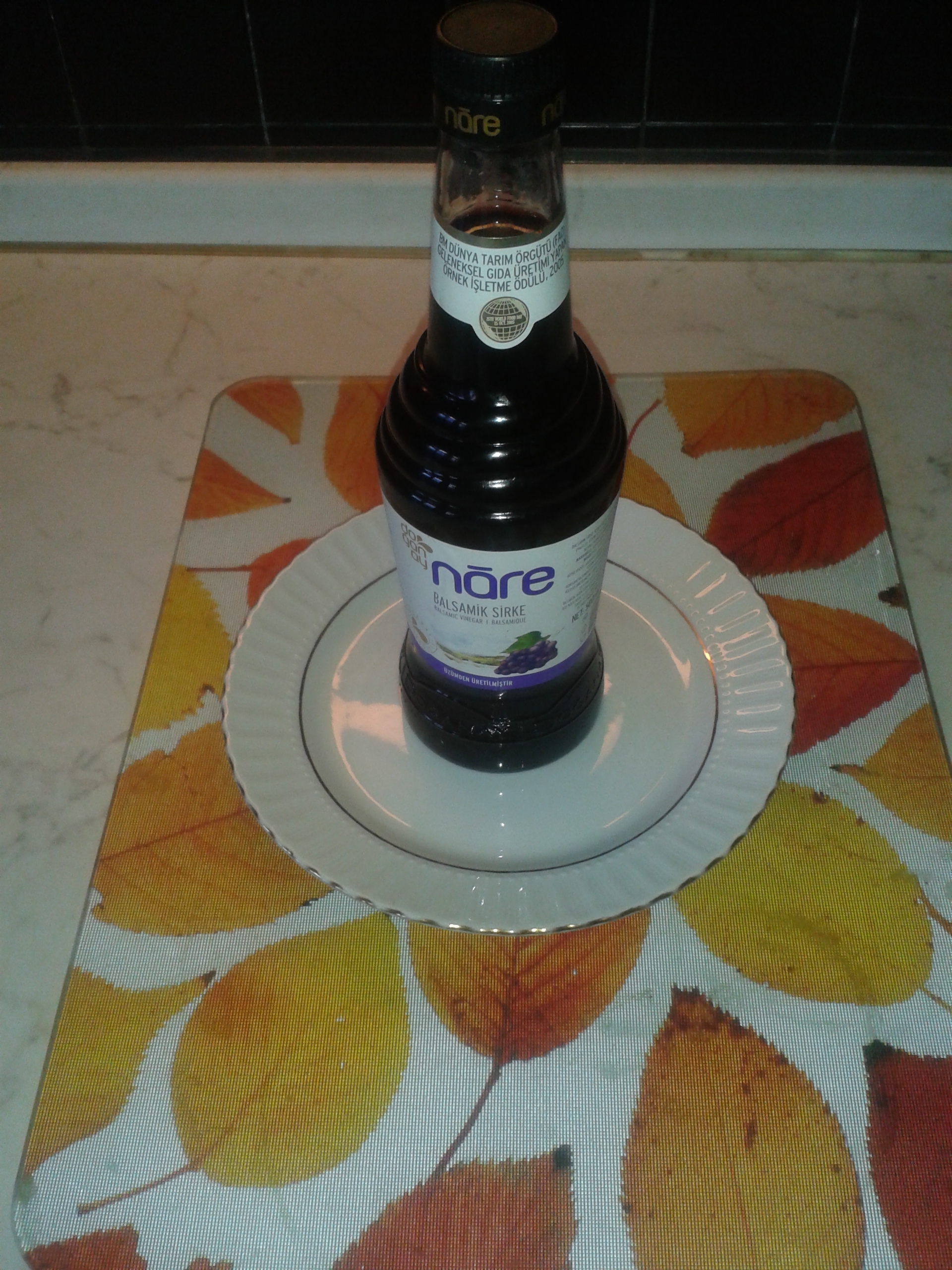
A Turkish balsamic

== Traditional processes ==
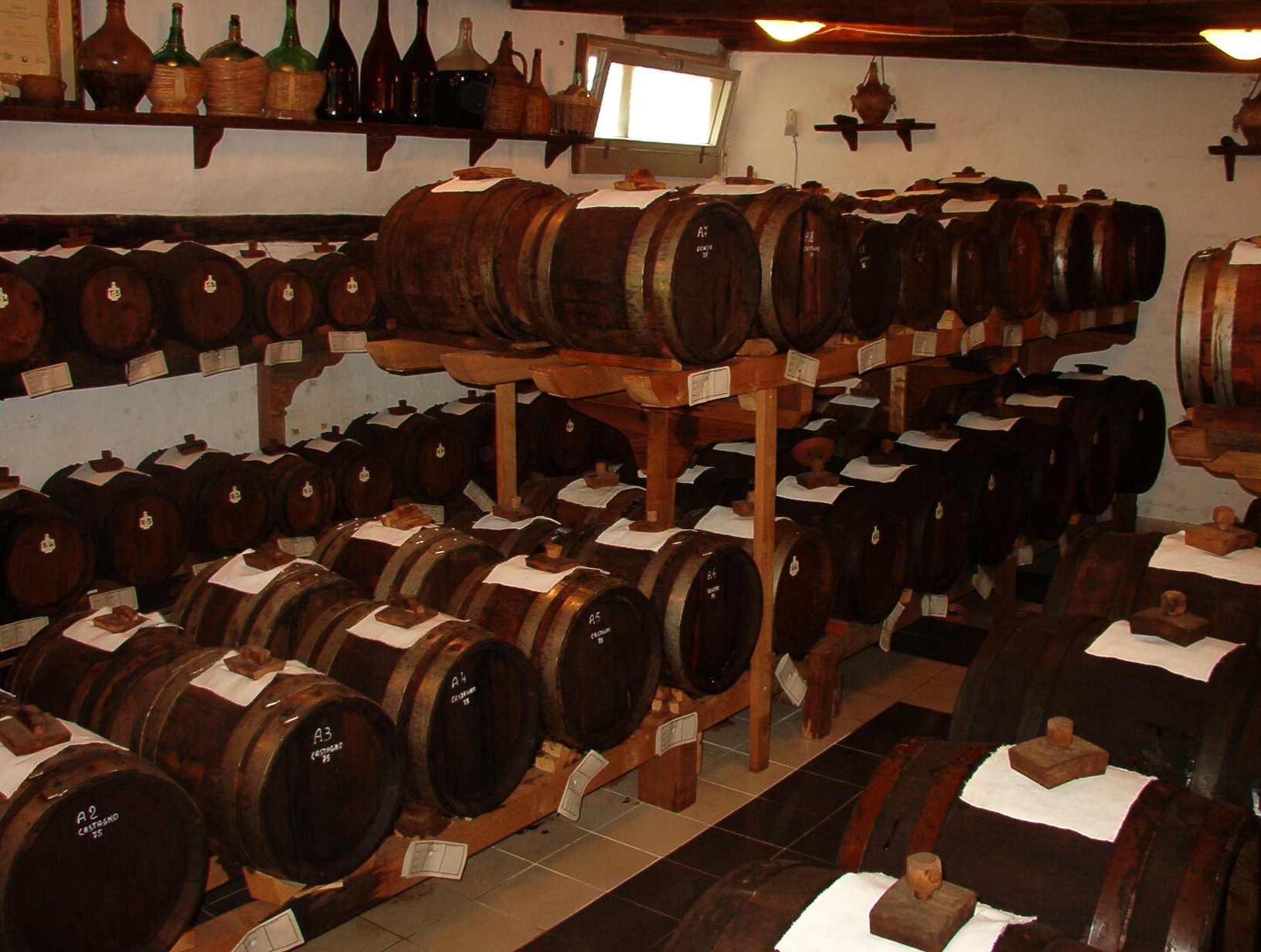
Barrels of balsamic vinegar aging

Traditional balsamic vinegar is produced from the juice of just-harvested white grapes, typically, Trebbiano grapes, boiled down to reach a minimum sugar concentration of 30% (brix) or more in the must, which is then fermented with a slow ageing process which further concentrates the flavours. The flavour intensifies over the years, with the vinegar being stored in wooden casks, becoming sweet, viscous, and very concentrated. During this period, a portion evaporates: it is said that this is the "angels' share", a term also used in the production of bourbon whiskey, Scotch whisky, wine, and other alcoholic beverages.

None of the product may be withdrawn until the end of the minimum aging period of 12 years. At the end of the aging period (12, 18 or 25 years), a small portion is drawn from the smallest cask, and each cask is then topped up with the contents of the preceding (next larger) cask. Freshly reduced cooked must is added to the largest cask, and in every subsequent year, the drawing and topping up process is repeated. This process, in which the product is distributed from the oldest cask and then refilled from the next oldest vintage cask, is called solera or in perpetuum.

== See also ==
- Balsamic vinegar of Modena
- Traditional balsamic vinegar

== Works cited ==
- Cervetti, Giorgio (2001). "The Wine-Producing Cycle". The Art of Winemaking: Related Artifacts from the Region of Modena, Northern Italy. Los Angeles Craft & Folk Art Museum. pp. 33–48. OCLC 718285349.
- Giudici, Paolo; Gullo, Maria; Solieri, Lisa (2009). "Traditional Balsamic Vinegar". In Solieri, Lisa; Giudici, Paolo (eds.). Vinegars of the World. Springer. pp. 157–177. doi:10.1007/978-88-470-0866-3_10. hdl:11380/611387. ISBN 978-88-470-0865-6.
