= Francesco Aggazzotti =

Francesco Aggazzotti (January 18, 1811, in Colombaro di Formigine – February 25, 1890, in Modena) was an Italian lawyer, agronomist, oenologist, politician, and notary.

== Biography ==
He was born into a family of professionals and landowners, from whom he inherited a passion for the legal profession and agriculture. In 1837, he graduated in law and later earned a degree in both civil and canon law, as well as becoming a licensed lawyer and notary.

He practiced law while simultaneously managing agricultural properties, expanding the family's land holdings. Aggazzotti rationalized crop cultivation and initiated the production of wines, based on the study and classification of grape varieties and the qualities of individual grapes. He also produced balsamic vinegar, establishing its rules in a letter dated March 2, 1862, to the lawyer Pio Fabriani, a letter that he promptly published. This text now serves as the foundation for the production regulations of Protected Designation of Origin for Traditional Balsamic Vinegar.

In 1847, he married Marianna Rovighi, with whom he had eleven children. During the events of 1848, he served as the municipal commissioner of the provisional government. Upon the return of Duke Francesco V, he allowed those who had actively participated in the events some time to leave the duchy to avoid excessive repression. Francesco temporarily stayed in Pistoia, but he was soon allowed to return, thanks to the intercession of his father-in-law, who served as an honor guard to the duke. This experience influenced his political life after the unification of Italy. In Modena, he became a city councilor and provincial councilor, and in Formigine, he served as a city councilor, assessor, and mayor at the time of national unification and for several years. He wrote pioneering works on grapes and wine. In particular, he had a comprehensive vision of Lambrusco as a product, studying and promoting it from grape selection, cultivation, vinification, trade, and marketing through agricultural fairs and publications in specialized magazines. Along with other landowners, he established an Agricultural Council and later an Agricultural Station to promote and protect agriculture, as well as a Society of Modenese Floriculturists.

His production was awarded three medals at the Italian Exhibition (Esposizione nazionale italiana) in Florence in 1861: one for a bull, one for his wines, including a Lambrusco, and one for balsamic vinegar. In recognition of his services to the state, he was knighted into the Order of Saints Maurice and Lazarus in 1862, immediately following the proclamation of the Kingdom of Italy.

He died in Modena on February 25, 1890, at the age of seventy-eight. He was buried in the family tomb in his native Colombaro. In his will, he established an endowment to provide for the medicine and needs of the poor sick in the village.

== Works ==
- On the Useful Application of Ethereal Matter in the Vinification Process, Tip. Antonio and Angelo Cappelli, Modena 1861, 11 p. [also in "Rural Economy," 4 / "Agricultural Repertory," 65 (1861), pp. 533–538]
- On Modenese Balsamic Vinegar, in "Rural Economy," 5 / "Agricultural Repertory," 66 (1862), pp. 211–214
- On the Manufacture of Modenese Lambrusco Wine, in "Rural Economy," 6 / "Agricultural Repertory," 67 (1863), pp. 538–543 575-579 637-640.
- Remarks on the Manufacture of Wines in the Modena Province, Tip. Vincenzi, Modena 1866, 13 pp.
- Descriptive Catalog of the Main Varieties of Grapes Cultivated by Lawyer Francesco Aggazzotti of Colombaro, Tipography of Carlo Vincenzi, Modena 1867, 48 pp. [reprint: Il Fiorino, Modena 1993; also in Francesco Aggazzotti: First Mayor of Formigine in Unified Italy. Winemaker, Agricultural Entrepreneur, Politician. The Origins of Lambruschi Modenesi and Balsamic Vinegar, edited by Riccardo Fangarezzi, Terra e Identità, Modena 2011, pp. 259–316, with an appendix otherwise unknown in print at pp. 313–316]
- Modenese Cultivation System. Brief Explanatory Notes of the Map Presented at the National Exhibition in Milan by Lawyer Francesco Aggazzotti, 1881 [manuscript]
- [Appendix to the Descriptive Catalog of the Main Varieties of Grapes], Colombaro 1883, 4 pp. [only reprinted: Francesco Aggazzotti: First Mayor of Formigine in Unified Italy. Winemaker, Agricultural Entrepreneur, Politician. The Origins of Lambruschi Modenesi and Balsamic Vinegar, edited by Riccardo Fangarezzi, Terra e Identità, Modena 2011, pp. 313–316]

All published works by Aggazzotti are now reprinted in Francesco Aggazzotti primo sindaco di Formigine nell'Italia unita. Viticoltore, imprenditore agricolo, politico. All'origine dell'idea di Lambruschi Modenesi e di Aceto Balsamico, edited by Riccardo Fangarezzi, Terra e Identità, Modena 2011, pp. 211–316.

== Honors ==
- Order of Saints Maurice and Lazarus
