= Moustalevria =

Traditional Greek kind of pudding

- Alternative names: Moustokouloura (cookies), mustopita (pie form), palouzes, kefteria, kourkouta
- Type: Pudding
- Place of origin: Greece
- Main ingredients: Grape must, flour

Moustalevria (Greek: μουσταλευριά) or must jelly (also mustpie and mustcake) is a traditional Greek kind of pudding made of grape must mixed with flour and boiled until thick. Moustokouloura, must biscuits or must cookies are the biscuit (cookie) version.

== Historical information and names ==
Moustalevria originated in Ancient Greece where it was known under the name oinouta (Ancient Greek: οινούτα).

During the Byzantine era it was called mustopita (μουστόπιτα) or pastellos (πάστελλος). Nowadays except from its standard name, moustalevria has alternative names that differ from place to place, e.g., it is also known as kefteria in Crete, kourkouta in Samos, palouzes in Cyprus and mustopita in other regions.

== Preparation ==
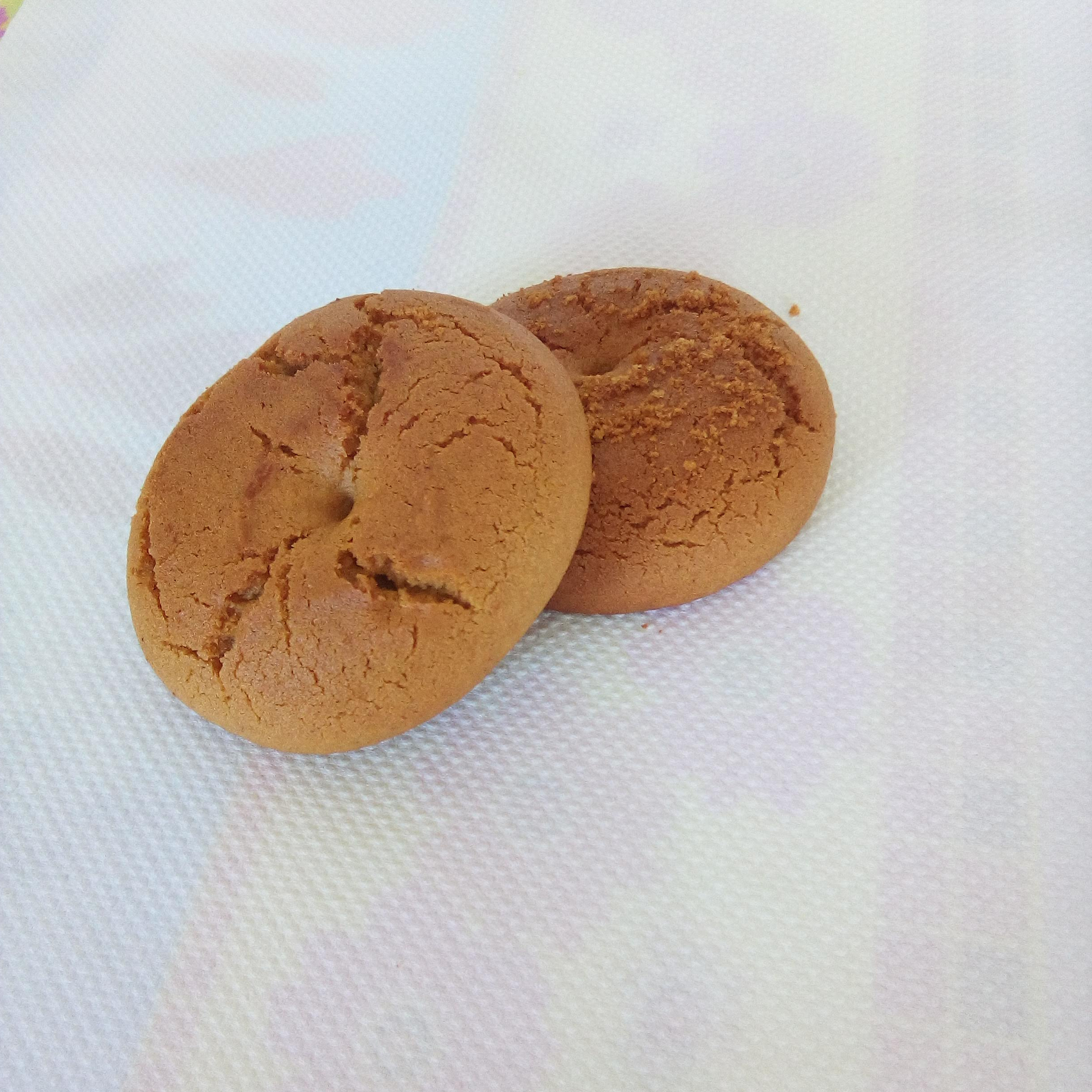
Moustokouloura

In order to produce moustalevria, grape must (the juice from pressed grapes before fermentation) is boiled in low fire. Then a small amount of argil is added in order to clean the must. After the boil, ingredients like flour, sugar, semolina, petimezi, sesame, vanilla, almonds, walnuts, etc. are included. Moustalevria is popular at grape harvest season when the must is fresh.

== See also ==
- Ancient Greek cuisine
- List of grape dishes
- Pelamushi
- Sugolo
