= Sugolo =

Italian dessert

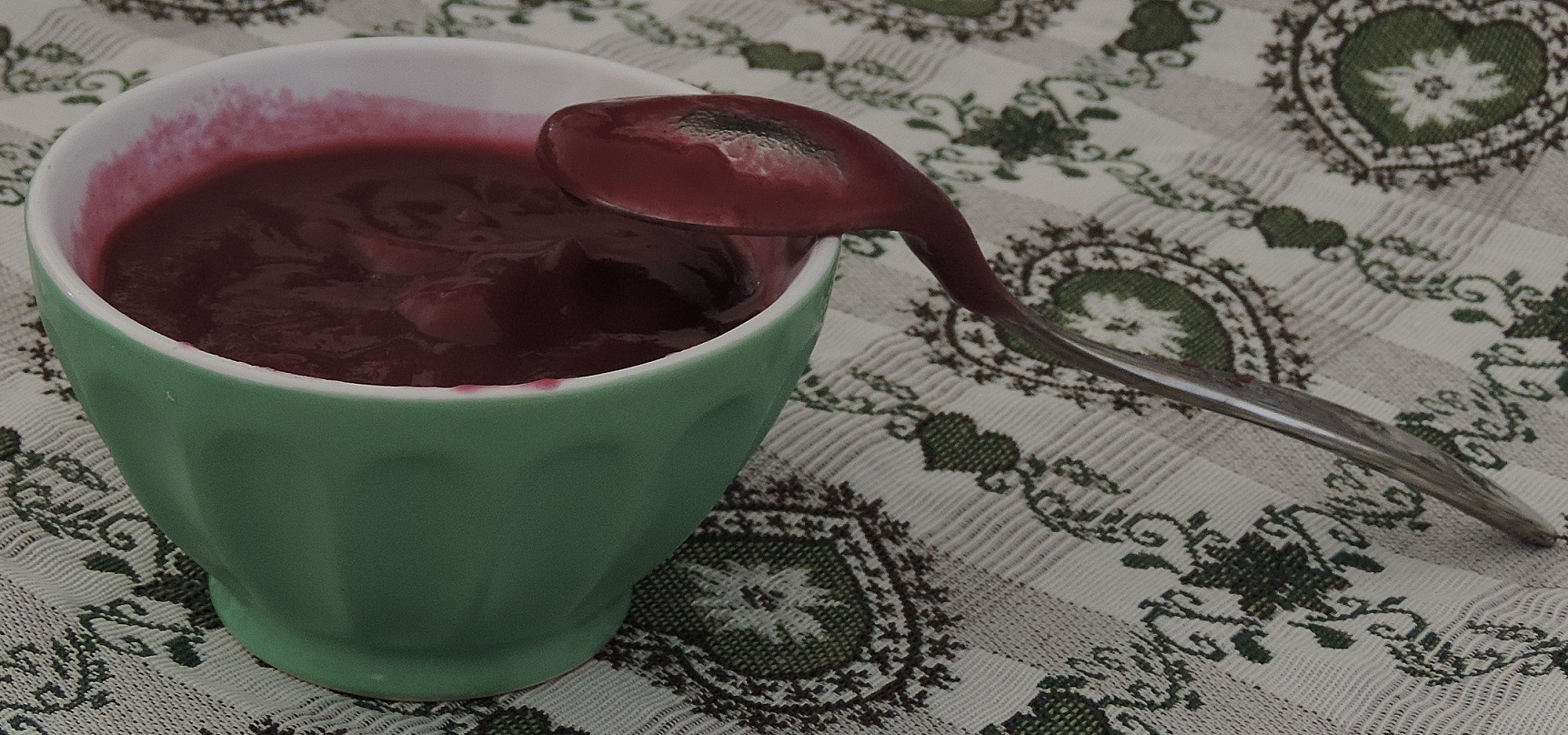
- Type: Dessert
- Place of origin: Italy
- Region or state: Northern Italy
- Main ingredients: Must of red grapes, flour, sugar

Sugolo is a northern Italian dessert prepared with the must of red grapes, flour and sugar, cooked slowly and then left to cool. It can be served cool, like a pudding, or preserved in a jar like jam.

== History ==
In ancient times, sugolo was prepared exclusively during the harvest period with only must and flour; recent recipes often also include the addition of additional sugar in addition to that of the grapes themselves. It can be enjoyed alone, or as an accompaniment to torta sbrisolona or with the same wine used for its preparation such as Lambrusco del Reggiano, Lambrusco Mantovano or Malvasia dei Colli Piacentini.

Sügol (in the Mantuan dialect) has acquired the status of denominazione comunale d'origine (De.CO) in 2021, by resolution of the comune (municipality) of Gonzaga, Lombardy. This version of sugolo takes the name of crepada because it is cooked until the skin of the grapes cracks.

== See also ==
- List of Italian desserts and pastries
