= Queens Jewish Center =

Orthodox synagogue in Queens, New York

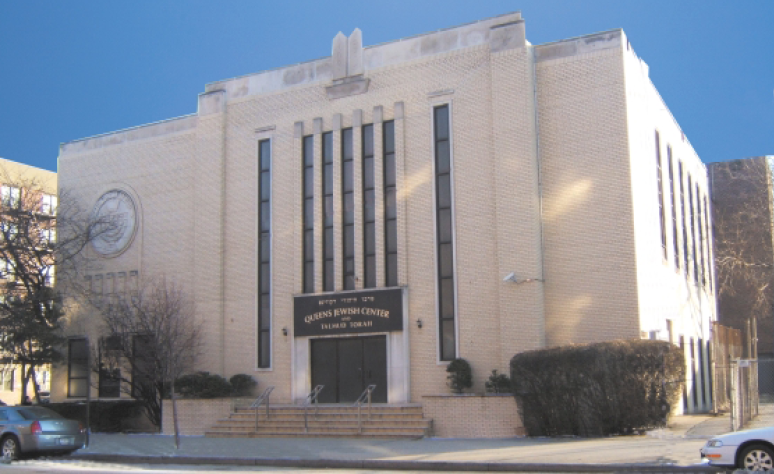
- The Queens Jewish Center – 108 Street entrance

- Location in New York City

Religion
- Affiliation: Orthodox Judaism
- Ecclesiastical or organizational status: Synagogue
- Leadership: Rabbi Judah Kerbel
- Status: Active

Location
- Location: 66-05 108 Street, Forest Hills, Queens, New York City, New York
- Country: United States
- Interactive map of Queens Jewish Center
- Coordinates: 40°43′49″N 73°50′52″W

Architecture
- Architect: David Moed
- General contractor: LeFrak Organization
- Groundbreaking: 1946, 1949
- Completed: 1955

Website
- myqjc.org

The Queens Jewish Center, also known as Queens Jewish Center and Talmud Torah or QJC, is an Orthodox synagogue in Forest Hills, Queens, New York City, New York, United States.

The synagogue was established by a dozen families in 1943 to serve the growing central Queens Jewish community. The current spiritual leader is Rabbi Judah Kerbel. Queens Jewish Center has services every day of the week, including holidays.

== Organization affiliations ==
The Queens Jewish Center is a member of the Orthodox Union, the Queens Jewish Community Council, and the Vaad Harabonim of Queens.

== Architecture ==
The Queens Jewish Center building won honorable mention in the 1955 Queens Chamber of Commerce, Annual Building Awards. The architect was David Moed of Manhattan and the builder was the LeFrak Organization.

The structure actually consists of two separate buildings. On October 3, 1946 an option was taken on the vacant plot where both synagogue buildings now stand. Ground was first broken for the first building (also referred to as the Talmud Torah building or Bais Hamedrash building) during an elaborate ceremony on June 5, 1949, by Judge Paul Balsam and Center President Herman A. Levine. The ground-breaking for the main synagogue building took place on June 21, 1953 and was made possible by generous benefactor, Mr. Harry LeFrak.

== Clergy ==
The following individuals have served as rabbi of the Queens Jewish Center:

| Order | Officeholder | Term started | Term ended | Time in office | Notes |
|---|---|---|---|---|---|
| 1 | Eliezer Harbater | 1943 | 1946 | 2–3 years | |
| 2 | Aryeh Gotlieb | 1946 | 1949 | 2–3 years | |
| 3 | Morris Max | 1949 | 1966 | 16–17 years | |
| 4 | Joseph Grunblatt | 1967 | 2006 | 38–39 years | |
| 5 | Benjamin Geiger | 2007 | 2013 | 5–6 years | |
| 6 | Simcha Hopkovitz | 2013 | 2018 | 4–5 years | |
| 7 | Judah Kerbel | 2019 | incumbent | 6–7 years | |

== Notable members ==
- Paul Balsam, a judge
- Rabbi Dr. Bernard Lander, rabbi of Touro College
- Harry LeFrak, a builder and philanthropist
- Leon Wildes, immigration lawyer
