= Traditional balsamic vinegar =

Type of vinegar originating in Italy

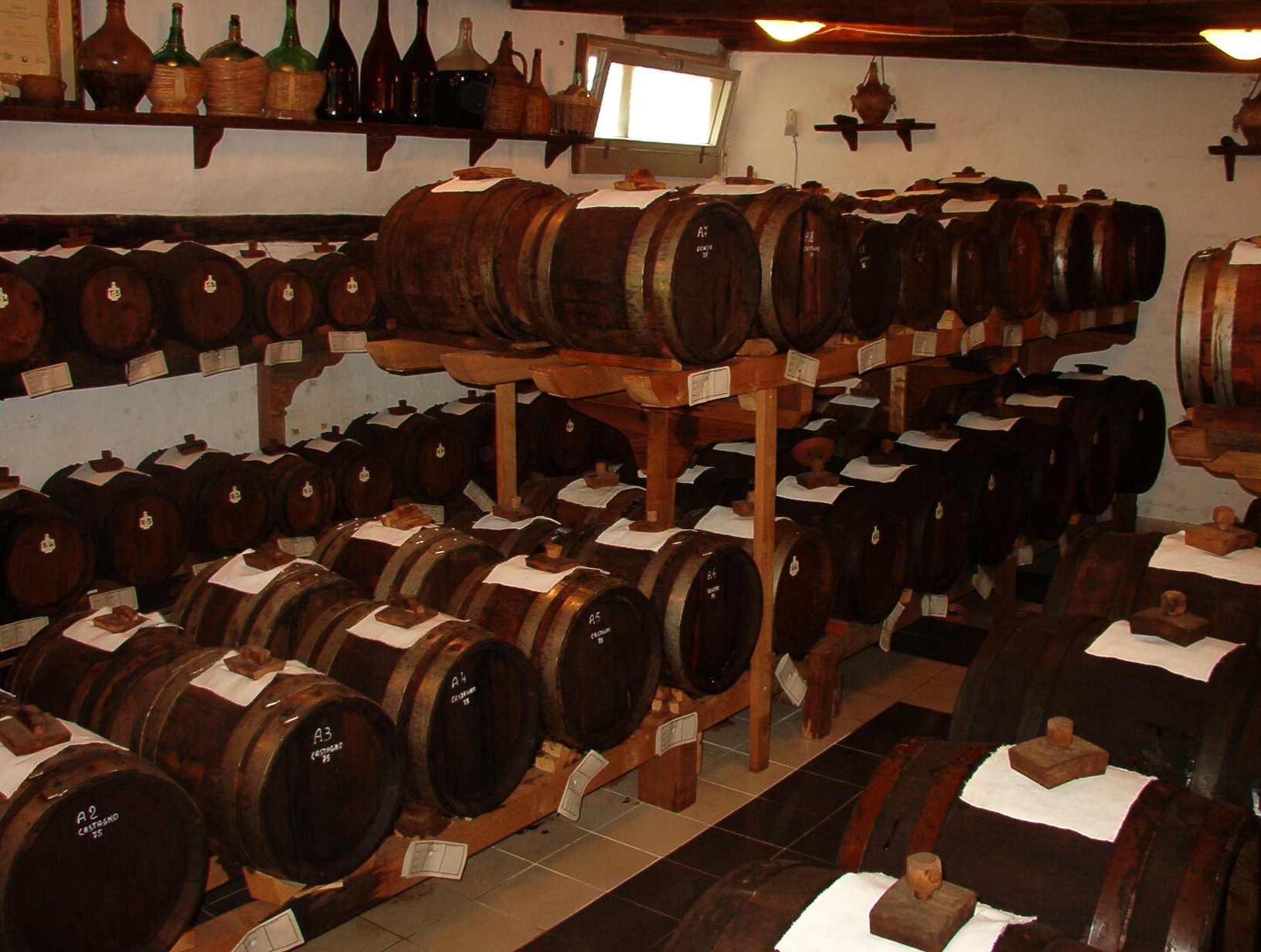
Barrels during aging

Traditional balsamic vinegar (Italian: aceto balsamico tradizionale) is a type of balsamic vinegar produced exclusively in the Italian comunes of Reggio Emilia and Modena, in Emilia-Romagna. Unlike inexpensive Balsamic Vinegar of Modena (BVM), Traditional Balsamic Vinegar (TBV) is produced from cooked grape must, aged at least 12 years, and protected under the European protected designation of origin (PDO) system, fetching higher prices (BVM has lesser protection under the European protected geographical indication (PGI) system). Although the names are similar, TBV and the inexpensive imitation BVM are very different.

== History ==
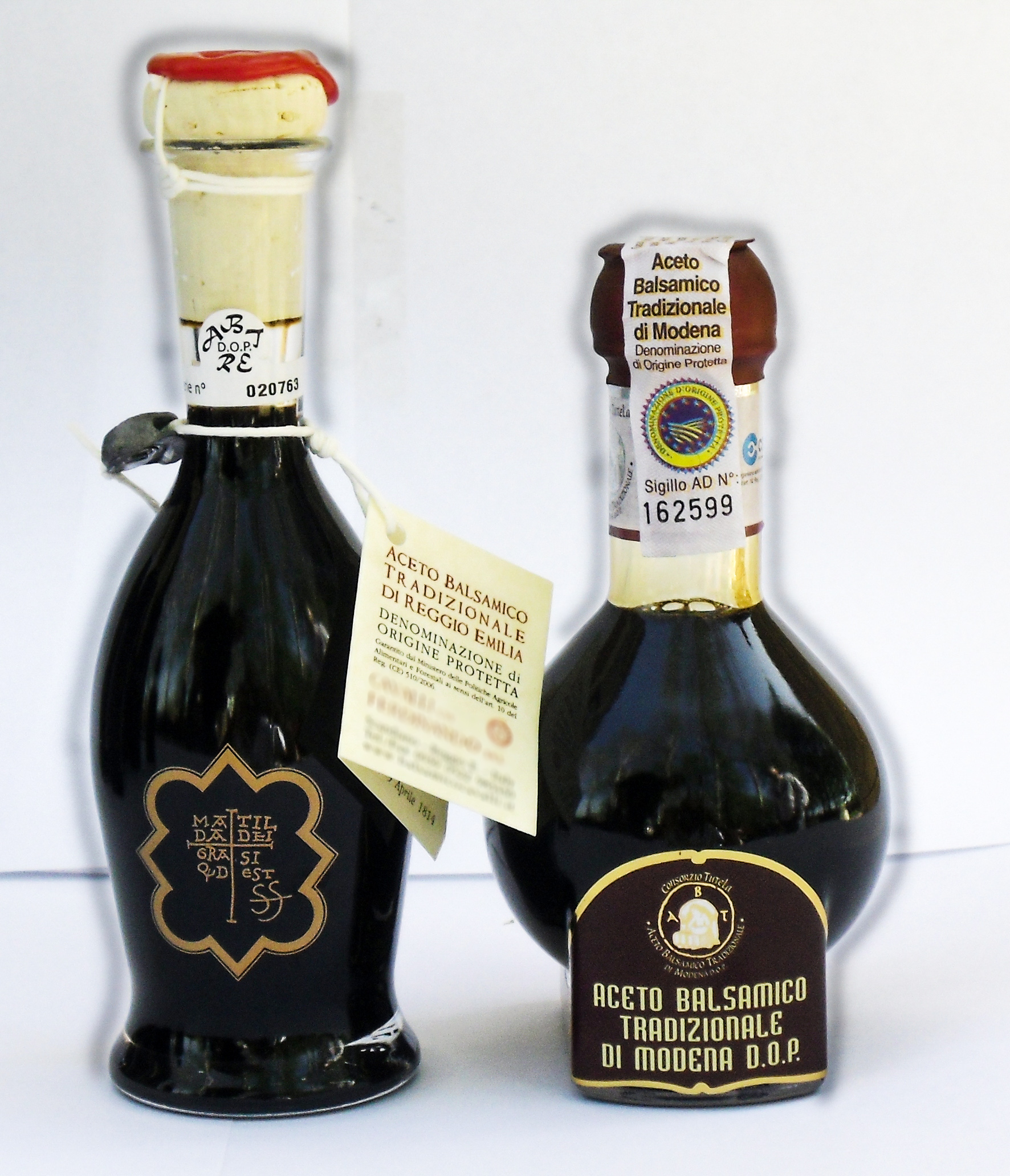
The two Italian traditional balsamic vinegars (from Reggio Emilia on the left and Modena on the right) with protected denomination of origin, in their legally approved shaped bottles

A comprehensive study of the original production procedures, the ageing conditions, and the sensory profile is not available. This and the few and often-confusing documents make the reconstruction of the true history of TBV a challenge. The art of cooking the must of grapes dates back to the ancient Romans: it was used both as a medicine and in the kitchen as a sweetener and condiment. The first generally accepted document referring to a precious vinegar produced in the area of Modena and Reggio Emilia is the poem written in the 12th century by the monk Donizo of Canossa, although the word balsamic is never mentioned. The first testimonies clearly speaking about "balsamic vinegar", as well as of recipes and making procedures, appear from the 19th century even if little is known about the original recipes and related production practices. The adjective balsamic has been used to designate any type of generically aromatic vinegar and products not just obtained from the fermentation of grape must alone. As far as the aging method is concerned, it is very similar to the Solera system used in Spain after the Napoleonic Wars which spread abroad after the second half of the 19th century.

The oldest and most detailed description of the method and techniques for the production of balsamic vinegar is reported in a letter written in 1862 by Francesco Aggazzotti to his friend Pio Fabriani, in which he describes the secrets of his family's acetaia (the vinegar-cellar where balsamic vinegar is made).

== Legal aspects ==
TBV is produced in two different geographical areas of the Emilia Romagna Region so that two different designations were granted by the European Council, i.e. Traditional Balsamic Vinegar of Modena (TBVM) and Traditional Balsamic Vinegar of Reggio Emilia (TBVRE). The two special vinegars are very similar products as the overall making procedure is the same; but, from a legal point of view, they are obtained according to specific and official production regulations defining (1) the basis of the vineyards ampelographic; (2) geographical area of production; (3) characteristics of starting materials; (4) making procedure; (5) the chemical, physical and sensorial requirements for sale; (6) bottling, labelling and presentation. The sensory profile of TBV is evaluated by hedonic judgment expressed through a numeric score. The sensory score achieved is used to rank TBV in different commercial classes. The specific regulations allow adding "Extra Vecchio" to the official designation when the product is aged for 25 years at least. However, under existing regulations, neither the definition of "aging" nor the methods for its objective evaluation are specified; it is evaluated only through panel-tasting tests, whose effectiveness for this purpose is clearly inadequate. TBV results as a blend of vinegars of different composition and age due to the traditional making procedure. Actually, an easy-to-use mathematical method for evaluating the actual residence time of TBV within each cask of the barrel set has been recently published. This method is an adequate tool helping aging certification. An easy-to-use spreadsheet of the theoretical model is available for download. (Note: Download) At present, however, independent agencies that officially state TBV authenticity of both the TBVM and TBVRE have not adopted it or any analogous procedure as an evaluation system.

== Basic technology ==
Making process of the TBV starts from freshly squeezed grape juice and finishes with sensory evaluation of the aged vinegar. From a technological perspective, several basic steps are required, including cooking of the grape must, alcoholic fermentation by yeasts, acetic oxidation by acetic acid bacteria, and slow aging within a barrel set.

=== Cooking of the grape must ===
Cooking of the grape juice is carried out in open vessels directly heated by fire for 12–24 hours reducing the grape juice by about 50%. The production regulations require starting from a grape must with 15 °Bx at least to reach at the end of cooking 30 °Bx for TBVRE; for TBVM, the lower limit is not specified. It is possible to find cooked musts with sugar concentration beyond 50 °Bx. The operation allows profound chemical and physical modifications affecting the end quality of TBV. Cooking stops all enzymatic browning reactions that rapidly occur inside fresh grape musts by polyphenol oxidase and progressively promotes grape must discoloration due to the heat-induced deactivation of proteins including browning enzymes. In addition, cooking promotes nonenzymatic browning chemical reactions involving sugar conversion, formation of high molecular weight melanoidins and furanic compounds such as 5-(hydroxymethyl)furfural (HMF). Water vaporization induces the concentration of sugars, organic acids, and polyphenols, resulting in the increase of density, viscosity, and refractive index (Brix degree), and, conversely, the lowering of water activity and pH value.

=== Alcoholic fermentation ===
The fermentation of sugar into alcohol (specifically, ethanol) and the later oxidation of ethanol into acetic acid occur as a two-step biological transformation of the cooked must. Both biological transformations occur inside a dedicated vessel, called the badessa. The fermentation of sugar into alcohol is carried out by yeasts belonging to a plethora of species and genera, and occurs in anaerobic conditions. In the past, the idea of a commensalistic interaction between yeasts and acetic acid bacteria existed, but recently the scalar fermentation has been suggested. The fermentation process is widely accepted to affect the end quality of TBV due to the several yeasts' metabolisms involved.

=== Acetic oxidation ===
In TBV, the oxidation of ethanol to acetic acid in fermented cooked must is carried out by indigenous acetic acid bacteria naturally occurring in the environment. These bacteria produce a wide range of compounds other than acetic acid, such as sugars, acids, and volatile compounds. The chemical composition of TBV is highly variable, depending on the alcohol, sugar, and acid content of the fermented grape must, the cooking modality, and the oxidation temperature.

Instead of relying exclusively on naturally occurring bacteria, as described above, the intentional addition of selected bacteria strains to fermented grape must has been proposed.

=== Aging ===
The aging is related to two basic concepts. The first concerns the time that vinegar spends inside the barrel set (age or residence time); the second accounts for all time-dependent changes in chemical, physical and sensory properties (physical ripening time).

==== The barrel set ====
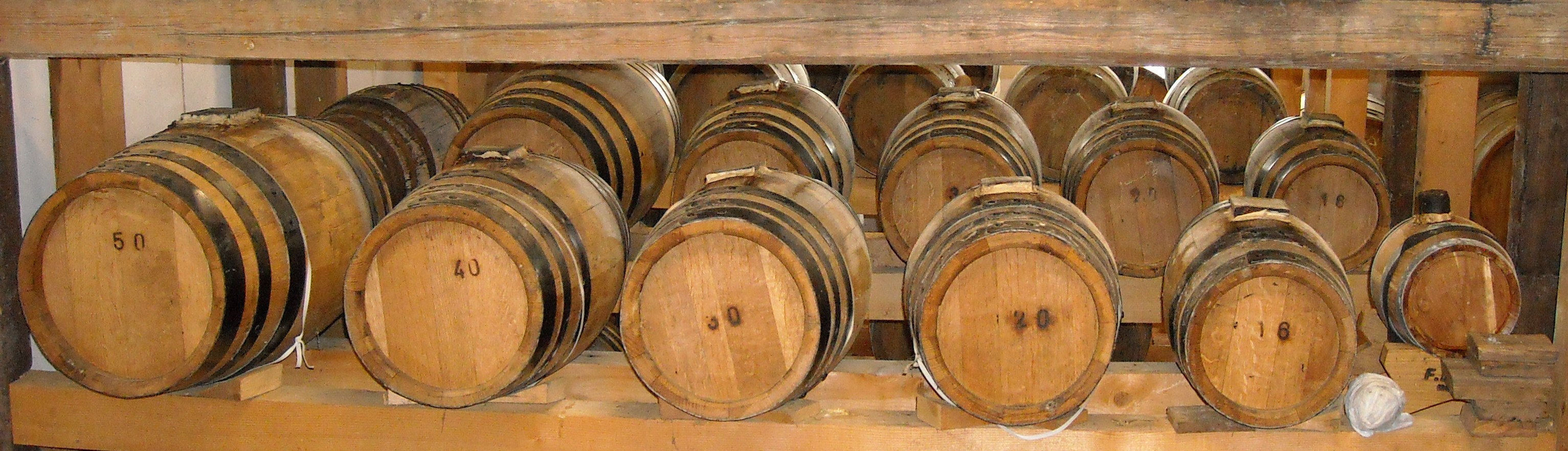
A possible configuration of the barrel set

The barrel set is a series of at least five wooden casks arranged according to a decreasing size scale, where the product undergoes profound changes over time. Casks may be of different wood types (e.g. oak, mulberry, ash, chestnut, cherry, juniper, and acacia), and the smallest cask volume ranges from 15 to 25 liters. Each cask has a hole on the top, the so-called cocchiume, facilitating the usual inspection and maintenance activities. The barrel set behaves essentially as a device for vinegar concentration due to water loss through the staves. As widely known for the wine production, it is reasonable to suppose that the wood acts as a semipermeable filter for the transfer of small molecules towards the ambient while it retains important volatile compounds such as the acetic acid. However, when the opening is not hermetically closed, the volatile compounds are lost preferentially through the cocchiume itself.

==== Refilling procedure ====
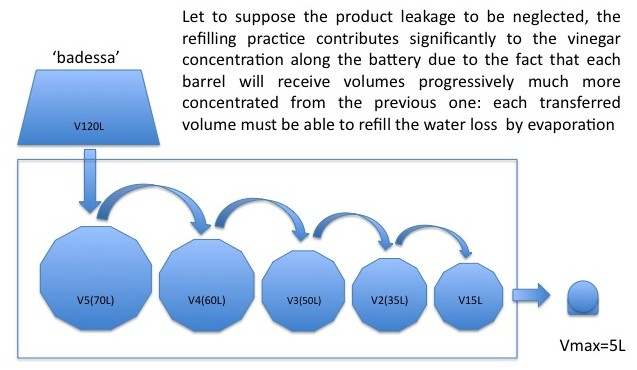
Refilling and vectorial concentration model in traditional balsamic vinegar production

The making procedure of TBV is a semicontinuous process requiring the annual refilling activity, consisting of withdrawing only a part of the vinegar from the smallest cask and topping it with the vinegar coming from the next cask along with the barrel set, and so on. The biggest cask receives new cooked and acetified must. This refilling procedure resembles the Solera method used for making sherry wine. The purpose of refilling in the TBV making is to keep the vinegar volume constant inside every cask in the barrel set, and compensate for the volume drop caused by these three factors: TBV withdrawn for bottling, water evaporation, and possible vinegar leakages from the staves. Refilling involves the product flux-splitting from the biggest to the smallest cask, leading to the solute dislocation along the barrel set.

==== Age and yield ====
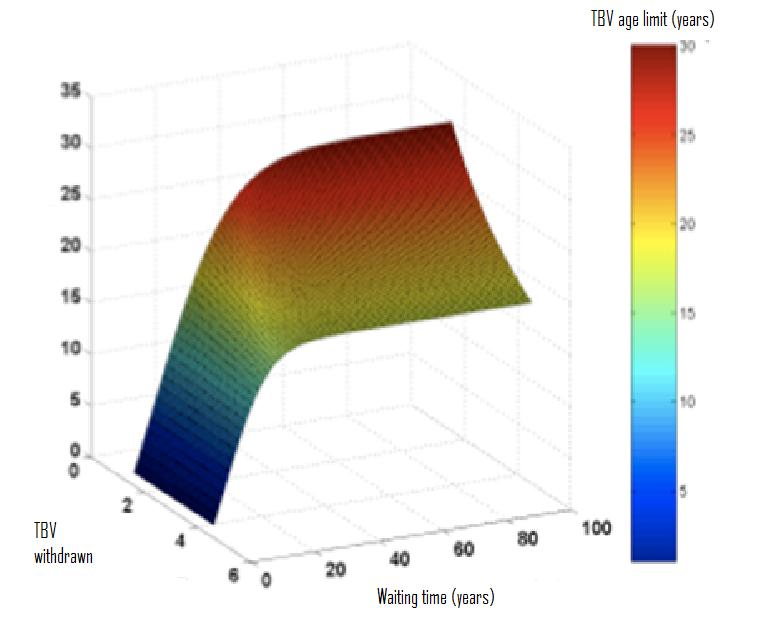
Refilling and vectorial concentration model in traditional balsamic vinegar production

Each cask of a barrel set contains a blend of vinegars with different compositions and ages due to the refilling procedure. As a consequence, the mean age of vinegar can be calculated as the weighted residence time of the different aliquots of vinegars introduced through the years. A theoretical model has been recently developed to estimate the mean age of TBV requiring refilling, withdrawn, and casks volumes as input data. The refilling procedure imposes an upper limit for the residence time of the vinegar inside the barrel set. The yield of a barrel set used for TBV production is easy to calculate by the ratio between the amount of TBV withdrawn (mTBV) and the amount of cooked must (mREFILLING) used to refill the biggest cask:

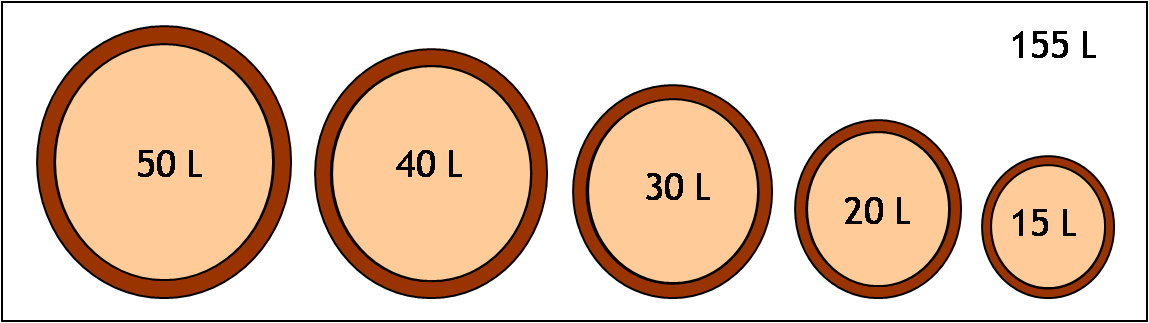
Configuration and capacity of the barrel set used in the model

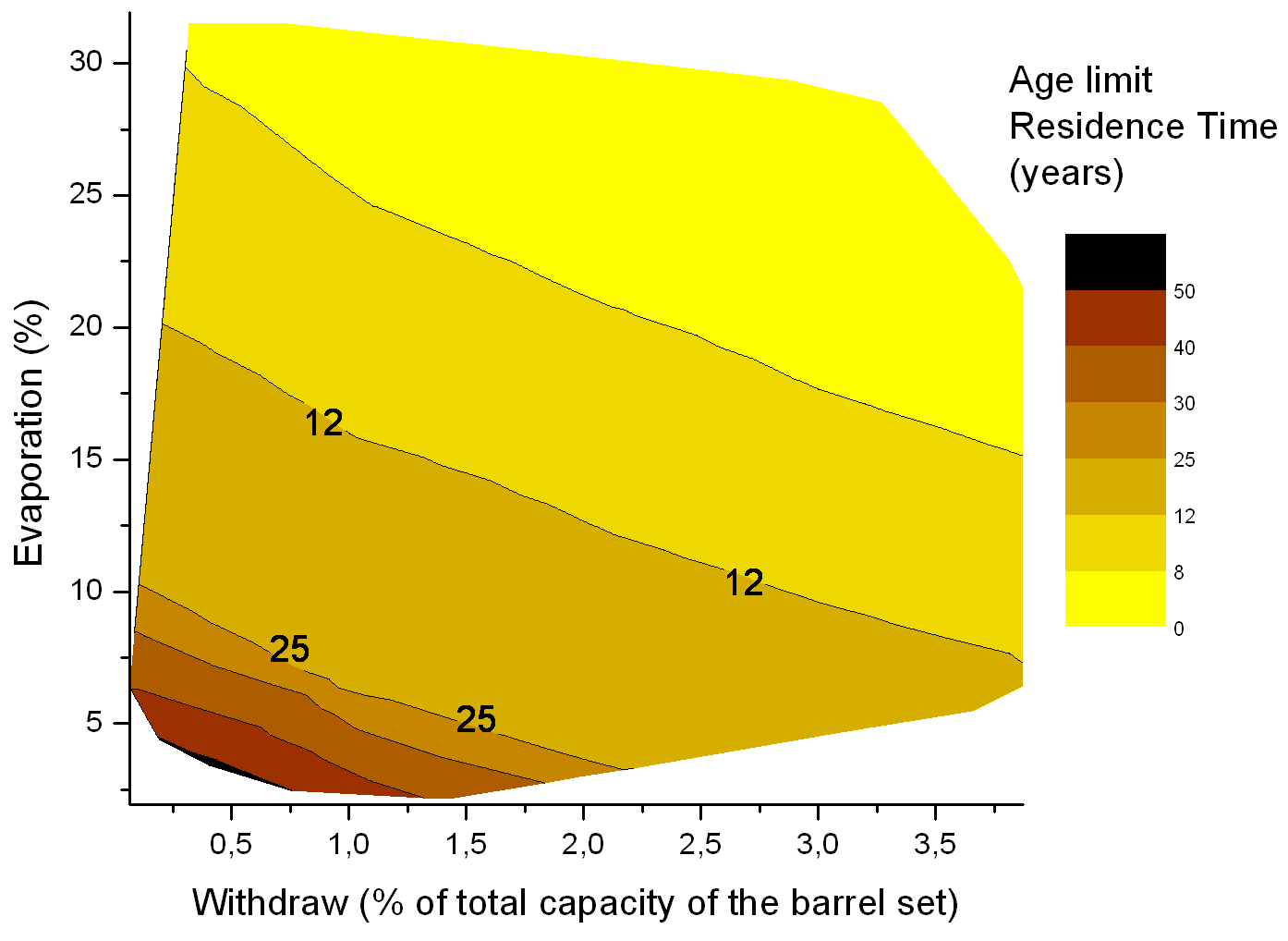
Residence Time limits obtained for the barrel sample as a function of evaporation and withdrawing

$\textit{Yield}=\frac{\textit{mTBV}}{\textit{mREFILLING}}$

Yield indicates the ability of a barrel set to concentrate cooked must at given operating conditions being dependent on the rate of water loss by evaporation. Low yields are due both to relatively low withdrawn and high water evaporation rates. The latter is the major factor lowering the TBV yield. The bigger is the evaporation rate, the higher is the flux of material through the barrel set and the lower is the residence time. As a consequence, when the yield is low, the vinegar age might be relatively low as a function of the amount of cooked must used to refill. Applying the spreadsheet of the theoretical model to a barrel set as in figure, the residence time obtained as a function of withdrawn quantity and evaporation rate is plotted in the concerning graph.

== Chemical composition ==
TBV composition
| Major compounds | Mean (g/Kg) | SD |
|---|---|---|
| Soluble solids | 739 (73.9°Bx) | ±10.5 |
| Glucose | 230.60 | ±30.45 |
| Fructose | 210.14 | ±30.37 |
| Tartaric acid | 7.8 | ±2.5 |
| Succinic acid | 5.0 | ±7.0 |
| Acetic acid | 18.8 | ±4.5 |
| Malic acid | 10.4 | ±3.2 |
| Gluconic acid | 18.7 | ±12.7 |
| Lactic acid | 1.2 | ±0.7 |
| Volatile compounds | Median (mg/kg) | SD |
| Alcohols | 18.4 | - |
| Aldehydes | 1.94 | - |
| Acids | 15.4 | - |
| Acetates | 2.61 | - |
| Esters | 0.71 | - |
| Enolic derivatives | 1.36 | - |
| Furanic compounds | 1773 | - |
| Ketones | 0.77 | - |
| Lactones | 4.5 | - |
| Phenols | 105 | - |
| Terpenes | 10.01 | - |
| Antioxidant molecules | Mean (mg/kg) | SD |
| Phenolic acids | 606.0 | 7.9 |
| Flavanols | 304.2 | 13.0 |
| Flavonols | 241.4 | 14.9 |
| Tannins | 349.0 | 19.5 |
| Major compound data from | | |
| Volatile compounds data from | | |

The composition of TBV is very complex and not yet fully described. The classes of the major components are the sugars (mainly glucose and fructose) and organic acids (mainly acetic, gluconic, malic, tartaric, succinic acids). The classes of the minor compounds refer to volatile compounds and antioxidant molecules mainly polyphenols. An important class of minor compounds, recently investigated, is that known as melanoidins, an heterogeneous mixture of polymers arising from sugar degradation reactions activated during cooking of the grape must. These polymers contribute to many physical properties of TBV including colligative ones, the refractive index, density, specific heat capacity melt, and rheological properties.

== Physical properties ==
The most relevant physical properties of the TBV are:

- pH is usually lower than 3; it is a measure of the extent of carboxylic acids dissociation.
- Density is usually intended as mass density at 20 °C, it cannot be lower than 1.24 g/mL (TBVM) and 1.20 g/mL (TBVRE); it is a measure of the extent of the solute concentration, as well as of water evaporation.
- Refractive index is usually expressed with Brix scale and reaches on average 73 °Bx.
- Color ranges from yellow/brown to brown/black during aging because of the accumulation of compounds, mainly melanoidins, from nonenzymatic reactions such as acid-catalyzed sugar degradation and Maillard reactions.
- Viscosity is a macroscopic measure of the degree of intermolecular interaction inside the vinegar bulk and is easily determined as the resistance to flow under controlled experimental conditions. The viscosity of TBV is on average around 0.56 Pa⋅s and determines the TBV fluency as visually assessed according to procedures in use to assign sensory judgements.
- Flow index indicates the deviation of the flowing properties from the linearity (Newtonian behavior).

== Standardization ==
The Italian standard for Modena TBV was originally established on 9 February 1987. The Italian standard for Reggio Emilia TBV was originally established on 3 March 1987. The two standards specify the material, the production process, and organoleptic and qualitative properties of the end product.

A new standard for Modena TBV was published on May 15, 2000. The new standard has the notable addition of two objective requirements for the end-product: the density at 20 °C shall be no less than 1.240, and the total acidity shall be no less than 4.5%.

A new standard for Reggio Emilia TBV was published on the same day. The minimum density is set at 1.200, and the minimum acidity is set at 5%.

== See also ==
- Balsamic vinegar
- Balsamic vinegar of Modena
