= Aging (food) =

Food preparation process

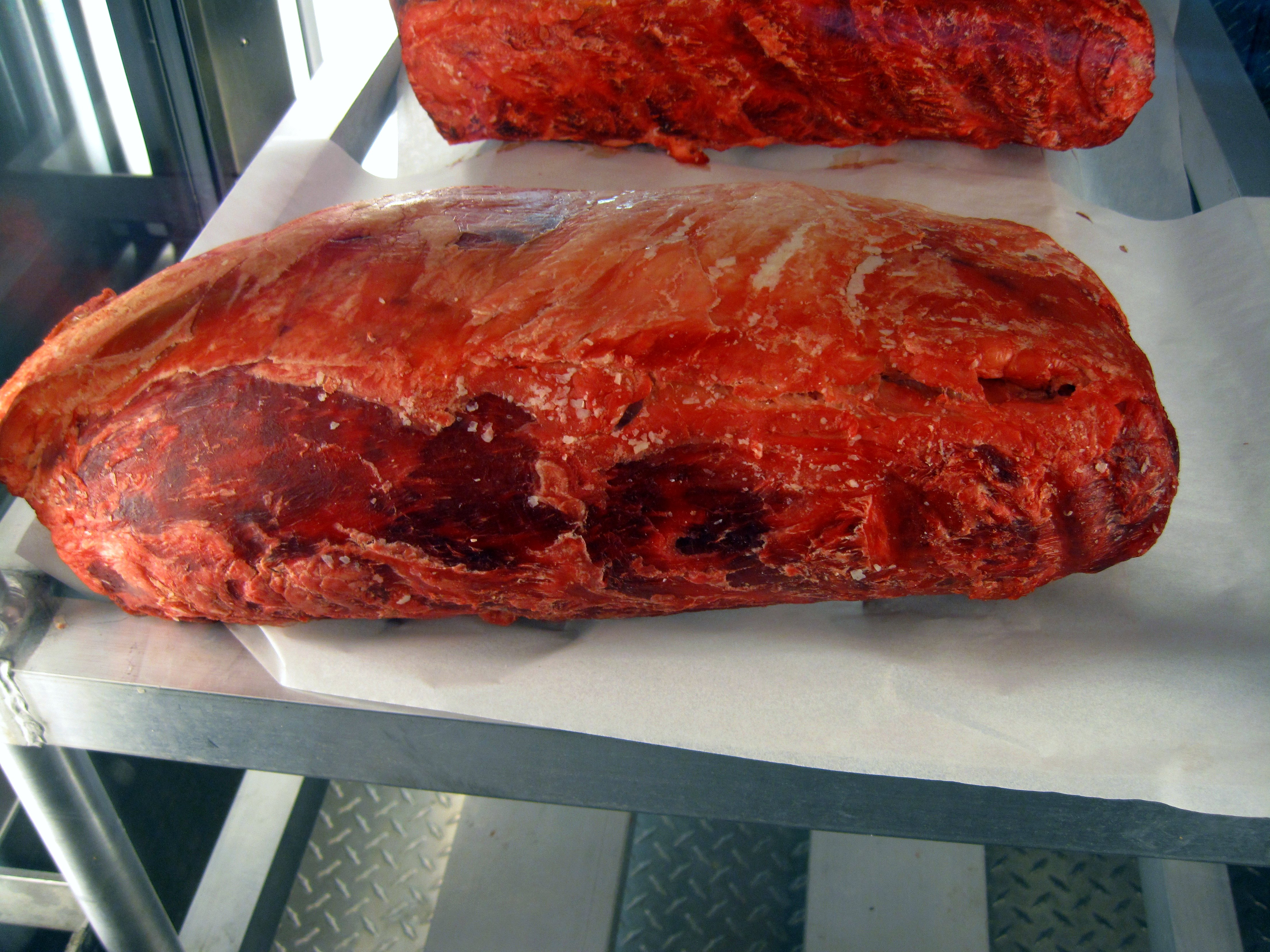
Dry aging beef

Aging or ageing, in the context of food or beverages, is the leaving of a product over an extended period of time (often months or years) to aid in improving the flavor of the product. Aging can be done under a number of conditions, and for a number of reasons including stronger umami flavors and tenderness.

== Drying ==
Drying of foods by leaving them in a low-humidity environment has been used as a food preservation technique for millennia. Air-dried meat such as jerky may have been some of the first preserved foods ever eaten by man. Drying also concentrates flavors in foods by removing water from them.

== Fermentation ==
Foods may be aged to allow fermentation to occur, such as in the making of alcoholic beverages, in cheesemaking, in pickling, such as kimchi, and in meat or fish products such as fermented sausage or surströmming.

== Culturing ==
Besides fermentation, microbial food cultures can act on food products to alter their chemical make-up and provide additional flavors. This is especially true in processes such as the making of blue cheese or aged beef.

== Extraction ==
In the case of beverages, such as the aging of wine, beer, or whiskey, storing the beverage for extended periods of time in wooden casks allows the liquid to extract flavor compounds from the wood itself, adding to the complexity and depth of flavor. Traditional Balsamic Vinegar is aged for years in a succession of oak barrels to extract and concentrate flavors.

== See also ==
- Cheese ripening
- Ripening
- Fermentation
- Beef aging
