= Paul Balsam =

American judge

Justice of the New York Supreme Court
- In office January 1, 1965 – December 22, 1972

Personal details
- Born: July 19, 1905 New York City, U.S.
- Died: December 22, 1972 (aged 67)
- Spouse: Caroline Sager (m. 1931)
- Children: 2
- Parent(s): Isaac Balsam; Sarah Eisig
- Education: Brooklyn Law School
- Profession: Politician

Paul Balsam (July 19, 1905 – December 22, 1972) was a justice of the New York State Supreme Court from January 1, 1965, until his death in 1972. He was born, and raised in Ozone Park, Queens. After graduating from the Brooklyn Law School in 1928. Balsam worked for several law firms as an attorney, he held several positions for New York State and City, including Assistant Attorney General (a position he held for seven years). In 1943, he was an Assistant District Attorney for Queens County and Queens County Tax Commissioner.

In 1947, Mayor William O'Dwyer appointed him as a City Magistrate, from then until his death, Judge Balsam served on the bench of several courts, including the Family Court for over ten years and, the New York State Supreme Court for eight years. In 1968, Justice Balsam presided at the trial in which Herman B. Ferguson and Arthur Harris were convicted of conspiring to murder civil rights leader Whitney M. Young, Jr., as part of what was described as a "black revolutionary plot."

Balsam was active in numerous charitable organizations, including the Ozone Park Jewish Center and the Queens Jewish Center. He was the son of Isaac and Sarah (Eisig) Balsam. In 1931, he married Caroline Sager (November 13, 1908 - September 17, 2005). They had two children, Joel and Alan, an attorney and a physician, respectively, and nine grandchildren.
