= Balsam, Michigan =

- Unincorporated community
- Location within the state of Michigan Balsam (the United States)
- Coordinates: 46°12′28″N 88°22′51″W
- Country: United States
- State: Michigan
- County: Iron
- Township: Crystal Falls Township
- Elevation: 1,519 ft (463 m)
- Time zone: UTC-6 (Central (CST))
  - Summer (DST): UTC-5 (CDT)
- ZIP code: 49920
- Area code: 906
- GNIS feature ID: 1617430

Balsam is an unincorporated community in Iron County, in the U.S. state of Michigan.

== History ==
A post office was established at Balsam in 1909, and it was discontinued months later in that same year. The community was named for the balsam fir trees lining the original town site.
