= Isaac Balsam =

American farmer

Isaac Balsam (1880–1945) started the first Chalav Yisrael dairy farm on the East Coast, and possibly in the United States. Balsam was born in Mielec (Melitz), Poland, and was a Melitzer Chassid. He emigrated to the United States in 1898, lived initially with his uncle, Meyer Emmer, and worked on Emmer's dairy farm for about five years. In 1903, Balsam established his own dairy farm in Ozone Park, Queens. At its peak, the Balsam farm had 300 cows.

Balsam also ran a plant that processed milk from other farms. That milk was not Chalav Yisrael, because it had not been supervised from the time of the milking. However, the bottles were clearly labeled, so that it was easy to distinguish between the milk that was Chalav Yisrael and that which was not. The Balsam dairy farm remained in business until 1963. The area in which the farm was located is currently known as Balsam Village.

Balsam built a synagogue on his farm, Congregation B’nei Jacob, for which he was the sole support, and gave generously to charitable causes.

== Family ==
Balsam was the fourth of ten children. His parents were Jacob Balsam (1850?-1923?) and Bliema Necha Emmer (1860?-1932?). Balsam's three older siblings were Jacob's children from his first wife, Sarah Emmer, older sister of Bliema Necha, who was married to Jacob until her death (around 1878).

Balsam married Sarah Eisig (1880–1945), his first cousin, in 1902. Among their children was Paul Balsam (1905–1972), who served on the New York State Supreme Court from 1965-1972. Their other children were Maxwell (1903–1978), Morris (1907–1990), Rose (Isaacs) (1910–1999), Leon (1912–1995), and Nathan (1917–1996); in addition, one daughter died in infancy. They had twelve grandchildren, eleven of whom survived to adulthood. After his father's death, Balsam brought his mother to America, and she lived out her days on the Balsam farm. Balsam died in 1945, and his wife died seven months later; both were 65.

Maxwell, Morris, and Nathan helped run the farm over the years, especially after their father's death.
