= Balsam pear =

Balsam pear may refer to:

- Momordica balsamina, a vine native to Africa
- Bitter melon (Momordica charantia), a vine grown for its bitter and edible fruit
- Momordica dioica, also known as bristly balsam pear
