= Ancellotta =

Variety of grape

- Grape (Vitis)
- Color of berry skin: Noir
- Species: Vitis vinifera
- Also called: Ancelotta di Massenzatico, Ancelotti, Balsamina Nera, Lancelotta, Rossissimo, Uino and Uvino
- Origin: Italy
- Notable regions: Emilia-Romagna
- Notable wines: Lambrusco Salamino di Santa Croce DOC, Colli di Rimini DOC, Colli di Faenza DOC
- VIVC number: 447

Ancellotta is a wine grape variety mainly grown in the Emilia-Romagna region of Italy, but also in some other parts of north Italy, and in south Switzerland.

== Wine regions ==
In Emilia Romagna it is used mainly as a secondary grape to make Lambrusco wines more amabile (slightly sweet)—specifically the Lambrusco Salamino di Santa Croce DOC (province of Modena), where it may provide up to 10% of the blend, and the Lambrusco versions of the Reggiano DOC (province of Reggio Emilia), where it may account for up to 15%. One of its main applications is as a colorant for lightly colored red wines throughout Italy, and in particular is allowed in some 42 IGT wines.

In the south-west of the region, in the provinces of Forlì-Cesena and Ravenna, it is one of the varieties that may be blended with Sangiovese to produce the red Colli di Faenza DOC. In the Province of Rimini it is employed in the Colli di Rimini DOC wine. To a lesser degree Ancellotta is cultivated in Piedmont (around Vercelli), the Veneto, Friuli-Venezia Giulia and Tuscany.

=== Outside Italy ===
Outside of Italy, the grape is grown in southern Switzerland, in the canton Ticino and district of Moesa of the canton of the Grisons, where the grape is included in the list of recommended varieties for the red Ticino DOC. Total Swiss plantations of the variety in 2009 stood at 19 hectares (47 acres).

There are small plantings of the varietal in the south of Moldova in the Cahul region. It was brought over by an Italian winemaker who saw the climate and soil fit the profile of the grape. Chateau Tamagne, one of Russia's largest wineries, produces a dessert wine from its own plantings of Ancellotta in the Taman Peninsula.

It is also grown to a minor extent in the Brazilian wine region of Campos de Cima da Serra in the southern state of Rio Grande do Sul.

== Synonyms ==
Synonyms include Ancelotta di Massenzatico, Ancelotti, Balsamina Nera, Lancelotta, Rossissimo, Uino and Uvino.
