= Montù =

Variety of grape

Montù (or Montuni) is an Italian wine grape variety that is grown in the Emilia region of central Italy. While ampelographers believe that the grape is indigenous to the plains of the Po river, its numbers have been steadily declining with 1200 hectares (3000 acres) reported in 1990.

There is some confusion about the color of the grapes with the Vitis International Variety Catalogue describing Montù as a blanc grape, while wine expert Jancis Robinson and writers Joe Bastianich and David Lynch describe the grape as a red wine variety. According to Italian wine laws, Montù is a permitted variety in the white Denominazione di origine controllata (DOC) wine of Montuni del Reno.

== DOC wines ==
Along the banks of the Reno river in Emilia-Romagna, Montù is the primary variety in the white DOC wine of Montuni del Reno. Here the grape must make up at least 85% of the blend with other non-aromatic local white grape varieties permitted to make up the remainder. The wine can be made in both a still and semi-sparkling frizzante style. Grapes destined for DOC production must be harvested with to yield no greater than 18 tonnes/hectares with the finished wine needing to attaining a minimum alcohol level of 10.5%.

== Wines ==
According to wine writer Paul Saunders, Montù produces "pleasant straw-yellow colored white wine."

== Synonyms ==
Over the years Montù has been known under a variety of synonyms including Bianchetto, Bianchiana, Bianchino, Montoncello, Montonego bianco, Montuni and Montuno.
