= Must =

Winemaking ingredient

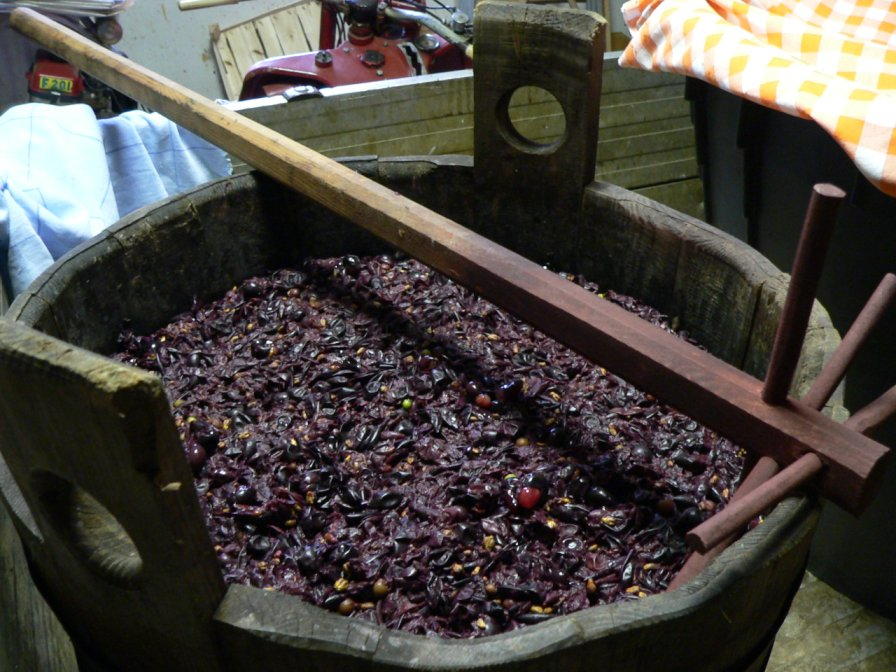
Grapes being pressed to create must

Must is freshly crushed fruit juice (usually grape juice) that contains the skins, seeds, and stems of the fruit. The solid portion of the must is called pomace and typically makes up 7–23% of the total weight of the must. Making must is the first step in winemaking. Because of its high glucose content, typically between 10 and 15%, must is also used as a sweetener in a variety of cuisines. Unlike commercially sold grape juice, which is filtered and pasteurized, must is thick with particulate matter, opaque, and comes in various shades of brown and purple. The name comes from the Latin vinum mustum; lit. 'young wine'.

== Winemaking ==
The length of time the pomace stays in the juice is critical for the final character of the wine. When the winemaker judges the time to be right, the juice is drained off the pomace, which is then pressed to extract the juice retained by the matrix. Yeast is added to the juice to begin the fermentation, while the pomace is often returned to the vineyard or orchard for use as fertilizer. A portion of selected unfermented must may be kept as Süssreserve, to be added as a sweetening component before bottling. Some winemakers create a second batch of wine from the used pomace by adding a quantity of water equivalent to the juice removed, letting the mixture sit for 24 hours, and draining off the liquid. This wine may be used as a drink for the employees of the winemaker or as a basis for some pomace brandies. Grappa, however, must by law be produced only from the pomace solids, with no water added.

=== Balsamico ===
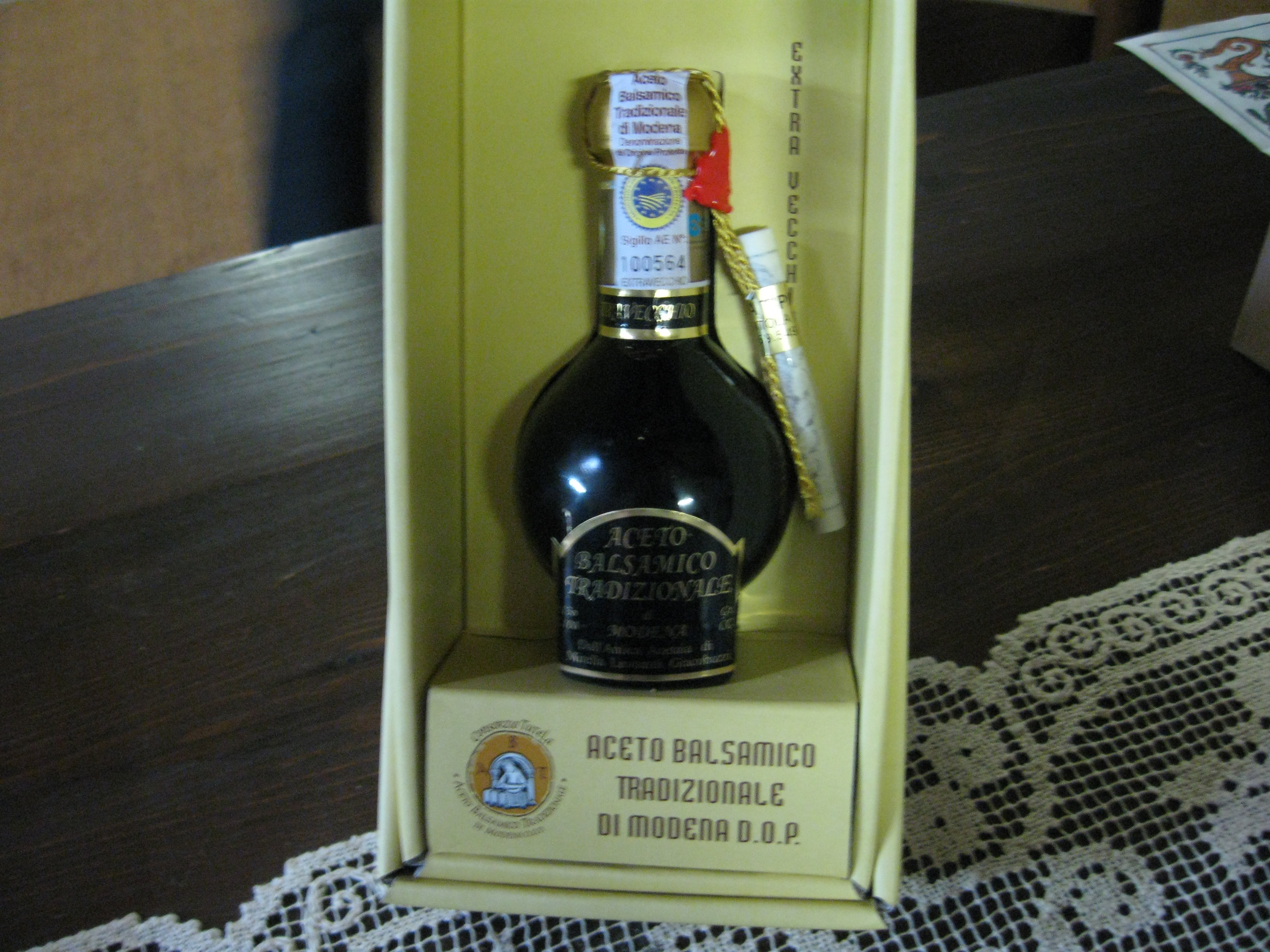
Bottle of traditional balsamic vinegar from Modena, Italy, containing grape must

The must is also an essential ingredient for the production of balsamic vinegar. Two traditional varieties of this vinegar (traditional balsamic vinegar) from Italy is protected through the European protected designation of origin system (PDO). A cheaper mass-market variety (balsamic vinegar of Modena), also from the provinces of Modena and Reggio Emilia, is protected as a European protected geographical indication (PGI).

For the PGI variety, selected bacterial colonies or the lenta in superficie (slow surface) or lenta a truciolo (slow wood shavings) methods are used for acetification, and then there is a maturation phase. Both the acetification and the maturation take place in precious sessile oak (Quercus petraea), chestnut, oak, mulberry, and juniper barrels. After a minimum maturation period of 60 days, a group of expert technicians will test the resulting product analytically as well as organoleptically (via taste, aroma, the palette and other senses).

The two PDO traditional varieties have stricter rules. The must can only be concentrated by heating, and not by any other method. The minimum maturation period is higher at 12 years.

=== Mead ===
This term is also used by meadmakers for the unfermented honey-water mixture that becomes mead. The analogous term in beer brewing is wort.

== In cookery ==
In ancient Greece, must condensed by boiling was called siraion (σίραιον) and was used as a sweetener in the kitchen in various recipes (and as a syrup over teganitai (pancakes)). From the Greeks, the Romans in ancient Rome also used the condensed must in cooking as a sweetener. Must was boiled in lead or bronze kettles into a milder concentrate called defrutum or a stronger concentrate called sapa. It was often used as a souring agent and preservative, especially in fruit dishes.

Currently, reduced must is used in Greek, other Balkan countries, French and Middle Eastern cookery as a syrup known as petimezi, pekmez or dibis. In Greece, petimezi is a basic ingredient for a must-custard known as moustalevria, and a sweet-meal known as soutzoukos, churchkhela. The Moustokoúloura or "must cookies" are also popular Greek cookies, which are based on a sweet dough made by kneading flour, olive oil, spice, and must. They are made in various shapes and sizes, and they are dark brown in color because of the must and the spice in them. In the wine making areas of South Africa must is used to make a sweet bun known as mosbolletjies.

The term petimezi is a Hellenized word of the Armenian/Trebizond term petmez. Petmez was a type of syrup that was made with berries of the white mulberry tree; petmez was used in Byzantium (Trebizond was part of the Byzantine Empire), where white mulberries grew in abundance, for their berries and for the silk worms that feed exclusively on mulberry leaves.

=== Roman lead poisoning hypothesis ===
Geochemist Jerome Nriagu published an article in the New England Journal of Medicine in 1983 hypothesizing that defrutum and sapa may have contained enough lead acetate to be toxic to those who consumed them regularly.

== Regional traditions ==
=== Spain ===
In Spain, the word mosto carries two distinct meanings depending on the region. In northern Spain — including La Rioja, the Basque Country, and most of Castile — mosto refers to unfermented grape juice, consumed as a popular non-alcoholic seasonal drink. In Andalusia, particularly in the provinces of Cádiz, Huelva, Seville, and Málaga, mosto denotes a young fermented wine of approximately 9–12.5% ABV, produced from the autumn harvest and ready to drink by late November after roughly 40 days of fermentation. This Andalusian tradition is comparable in character to France's Beaujolais Nouveau: seasonal, unfiltered, and consumed within the same year of production.

In the Serranía de Ronda (Málaga province), the village of Atajate maintains one of the most documented local mosto traditions. With a viticulture history dating to the 17th century, Atajate once had over 30 active lagares (traditional pressing facilities) before phylloxera devastated the region in the 1870s — the first regional outbreak in Málaga province. Several pre-phylloxera grape varieties survived and continue to be cultivated locally: Tempranillas, Perrunas, De Rey, and Uvas de Loja — heritage varieties not used in the region's modern DOP-certified bodegas.

Traditional production involves hand-harvesting in September and October, foot-pressing in stone lagares, and fermentation in chestnut-wood bocoyes (barrels) or glass vessels known as majuanas. After approximately 40 days, the wine undergoes trasiego (racking off the sediment) and is ready to drink by late November. The annual Fiesta del Mosto de Atajate, held on the last Saturday of November, has been recognised by the Diputación de Málaga as a traditional local festivity.

== In Christian liturgy ==
In Catholic Eucharistic liturgy, must may be substituted for sacramental wine, on condition that the ordinary has granted permission for the benefit of a priest or lay person who should not, usually because of alcoholism, ingest wine; but in normal circumstances it may not be used in place of wine.

Official Catholic documents define must (mustum in Latin) precisely as "grape juice that is either fresh or preserved by methods that suspend its fermentation without altering its nature (for example, freezing)", and it excludes pasteurized grape juice.

This teaching goes back at least to Pope Julius I (337–352), who is quoted in Thomas Aquinas's Summa Theologica as having declared that in case of necessity, but only then, juice pressed from a grape could be used. Aquinas himself declared that it is forbidden to offer fresh must in the chalice, because this is unbecoming owing to the impurity of the must; but he added that in case of necessity it may be done.

Aquinas himself declared:

Must has already the species of wine, for its sweetness ["Aut dulcis musti Vulcano decoquit humorem"; Virgil, Georg. i, 295] indicates fermentation, which is "the result of its natural heat" (Meteor. iv); consequently this sacrament can be made from must. ... It is forbidden to offer must in the chalice, as soon as it has been squeezed from the grape, since this is unbecoming owing to the impurity of the must. But in case of necessity it may be done: for it is said by the same Pope Julius, in the passage quoted in the argument: "If necessary, let the grape be pressed into the chalice."

=== Liturgical norms ===
The latest document from the Congregation for the Doctrine of the Faith on the matter, issued on 24 July 2003, gave the following norms, which simplify those previously in force:

The ordinary is competent to give permission for an individual priest or layperson to use mustum for the celebration of the Eucharist. Permission can be granted habitually, for as long as the situation that occasioned the granting of permission continues (e.g., the priest is an alcoholic).

When the principal celebrant at a concelebration has permission to use mustum, a chalice of normal wine is to be prepared for the concelebrants.

Given the centrality of the celebration of the Eucharist in the life of a priest, one must proceed with great caution before admitting to Holy Orders those candidates unable to ingest alcohol without serious harm.

Attention should be paid to medical advances in the area of alcoholism and encouragement given to the production of unaltered mustum.

== See also ==
- Amazake – similar early product in rice wine making
- Apple cider
- Arrope
- Julmust
- Wort – similar product in brewing beer
- List of juices
