= Lambrusco =

Variety of grape

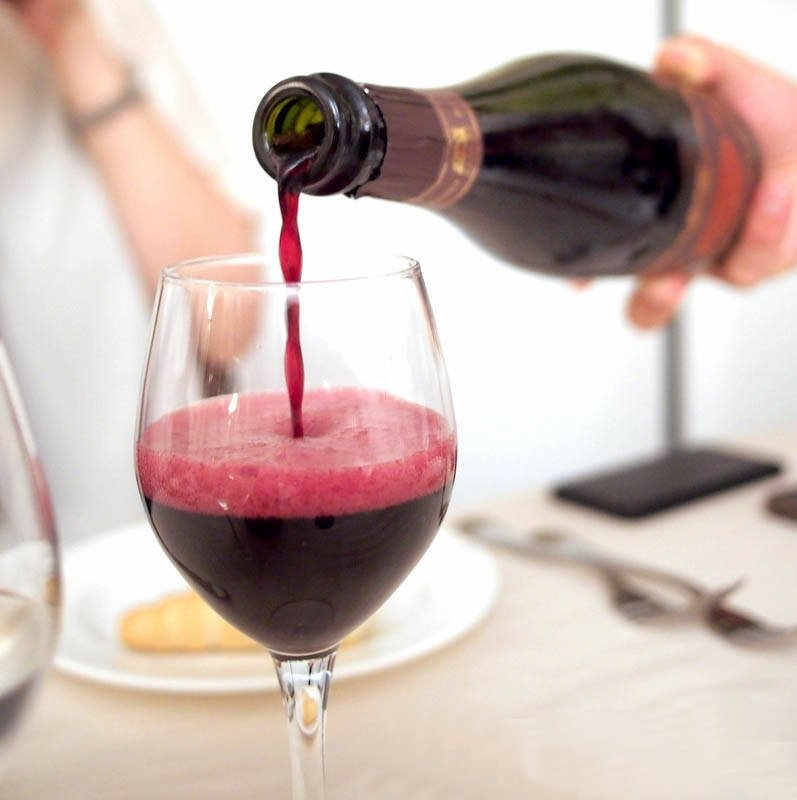
A glass of Lambrusco (Grasparossa version)

Lambrusco (/læmˈbrʊskoʊ/, Italian: [lamˈbrusko]) is the name of both an Italian red wine grape and a wine made principally from the grape. The grapes and the wine originate from four zones in Emilia-Romagna and one in Lombardy―principally around the central provinces of Modena, Parma, Reggio-Emilia, and Mantua. The grape has a long winemaking history, with archaeological evidence indicating that the Etruscans cultivated the vine. In Roman times Lambrusco was highly valued for its productivity and high yields, with Cato the Elder stating that produce of two-thirds of an acre could make enough wine to fill 300 amphoras.

The most highly rated of its wines are the frizzante (slightly sparkling) red wines, designed to be drunk young, from one of the eight Lambrusco denominazione di origine controllata (DOC) regions: Colli di Parma Lambrusco, Lambrusco Grasparossa di Castelvetro, Lambrusco di Sorbara, Lambrusco Salamino di Santa Croce, Reggiano Lambrusco, Colli di Scandiano e Canossa Lambrusco, Modena Lambrusco, and Lambrusco Mantovano. Throughout the 1970s and 1980s sweet Lambrusco was the biggest selling import wine in the United States. During that time the wine was also produced in a white and rosé style made by limiting the skin contact with the must. Recently, the global appeal of Lambrusco has grown and the wine is having a comeback, with a new generation of sophisticated vintners producing a variety of increasingly dry styles.

== Grape ==
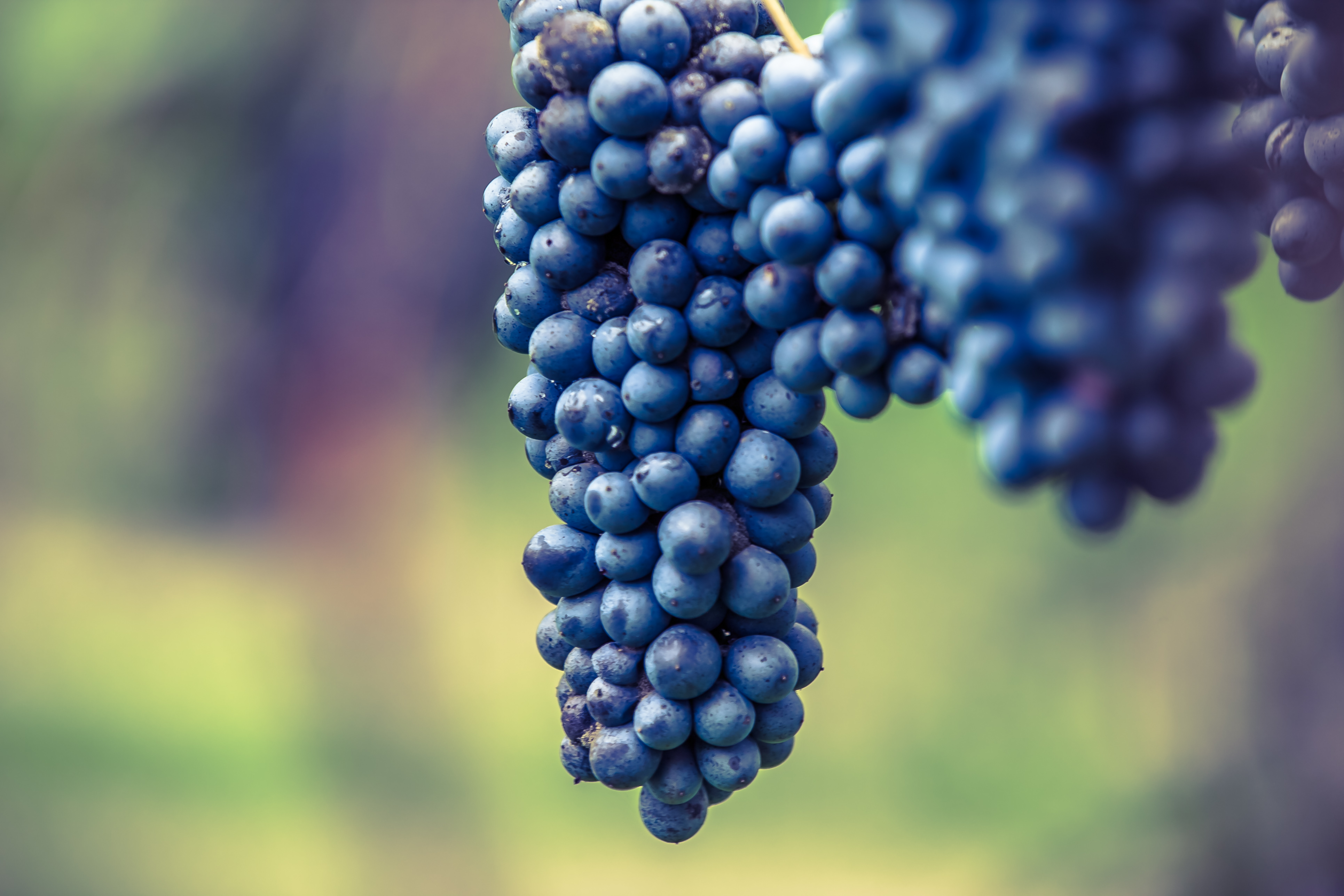
Grape of Lambrusco

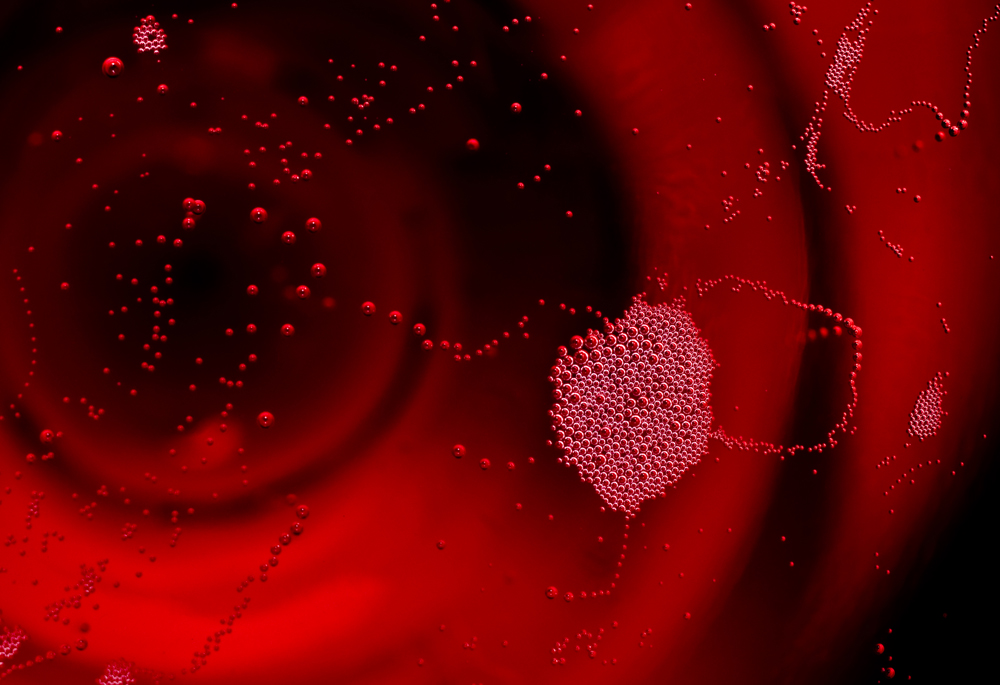
Effervescence in a glass of "Lambrusco Grasparossa di Castelvetro"

The most commonly found six Lambrusco varieties are Lambrusco Grasparossa, Lambrusco Maestri, Lambrusco Marani, Lambrusco Montericco, Lambrusco Salamino, and Lambrusco Sorbara. All of these various Lambrusco grapes are indigenous to Emilia and neither clones nor sub-clones. Most Lambruscos are made from more than one Lambrusco variety and additionally often blended with a number of specific blending grapes (max. 15%), such as Ancellotta (for color), Marzemino, Malbo Gentile, Cabernet Sauvignon (for body and structure), and others. The grape vines are often trained high above the ground to prevent the development of mildew. Historically the vines were trained to climb up poplar trees. The grape itself is not particularly sweet but many of the commercial Lambrusco versions are sweetened by either partial fermentation or with the addition of rectified concentrated grape must. When not fermented sweet, the Lambrusco grape is capable of producing an excellent dry wine with strawberry notes and a slight bitter finish.

By the end of the 20th century, ampelographers had identified over 60 varieties of Lambrusco scattered throughout Italy, including in Piedmont, Sicily and the Veneto. The most widely planted variety is Lambrusco Salamino.

== Italian wine ==
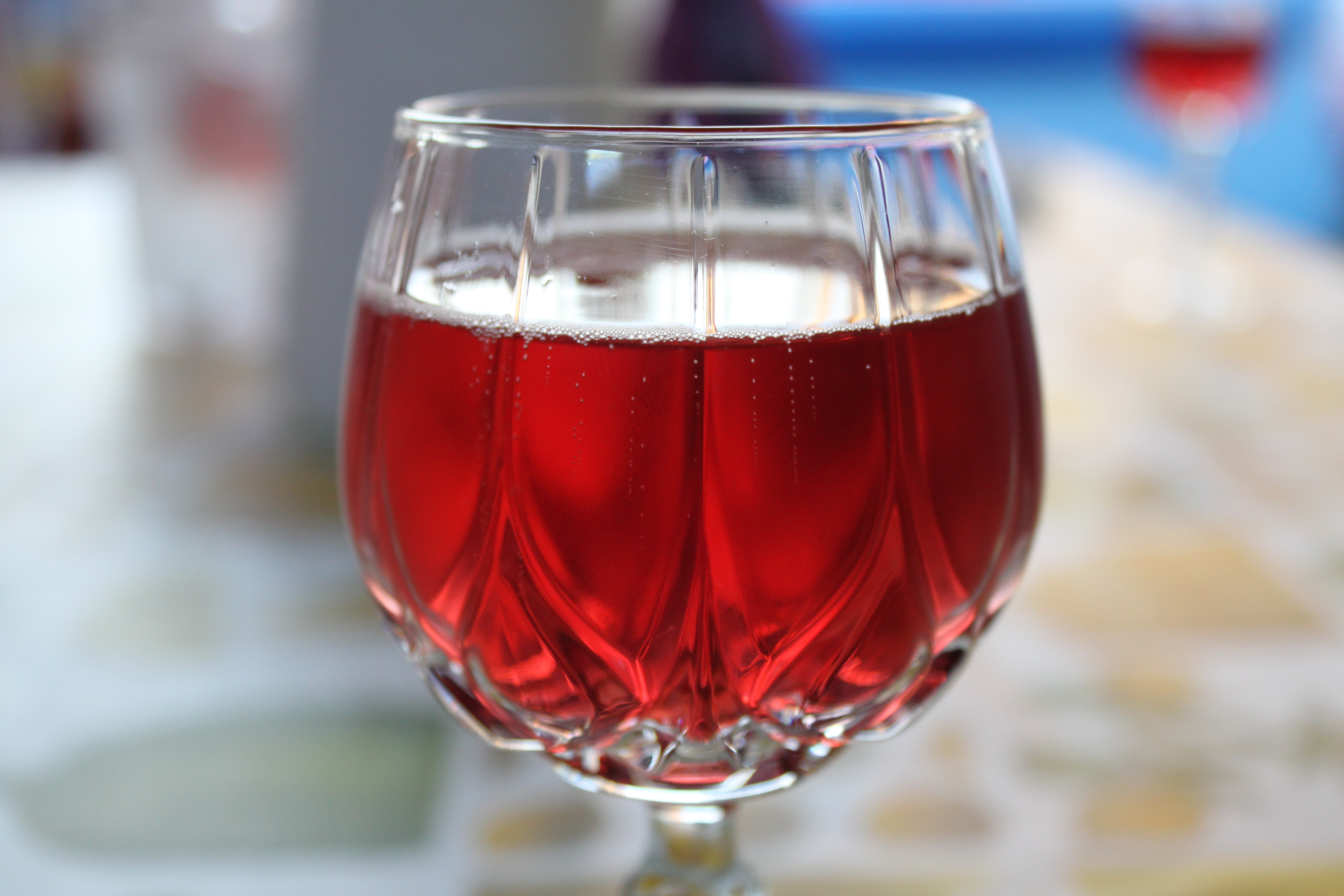
A glass of Lambrusco

Today, there are various levels of dryness / sweetness, including secco (bone dry / dry), amabile (off-dry / sweet) and dolce (very sweet). Sweet Lambrusco became hugely popular in the United States in the late 1970s–1980s, reaching a high of over 13 million cases exported to the country in 1985. The wine is noted for high acidity and berry flavours. Many of the wines now exported to the United States include a blend of Lambruscos from the different DOCs and are sold under the indicazione geografica tipica (IGT) designation Emilia.

The wine is rarely made in a "champagne" (metodo classico) style; instead, it is typically made using the Charmat process where a second fermentation is conducted in a pressurized tank.

=== Wine regions ===
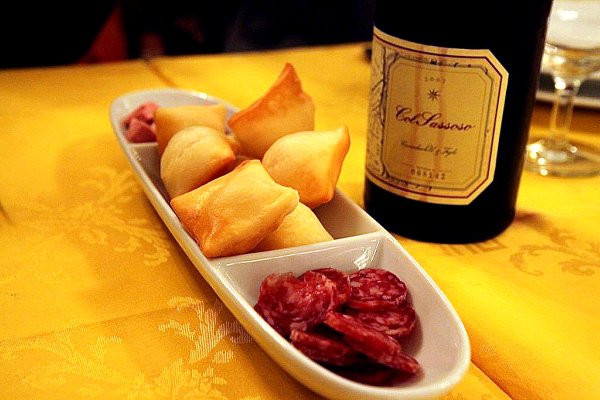
Typical Emilian food: gnocco fritto, salami, and Lambrusco

- Lambrusco Grasparossa di Castelvetro – the smallest wine-producing region located south of the town of Modena. The region is home to Grasparossa of which the DOC requires 85% of the wine to be composed of lambrusco. The wine of this region is typically dry and full bodied with a deep purplish-red coloring. Grasparossa produces the most tannic Lambrusco.
- Lambrusco Mantovano – the only major Lambrusco region outside of Emilia Romagna, in the Lombardy region. This style is typically dry, but some semi-dry styles are also made.
- Lambrusco Reggiano – the largest producing region of Lambrusco and the source of most of the exported DOC designated wines. A variety of Lambrusco grapes can be used, including Sorbara, Maestri, Marani, Montericco, Grasparossa and Salamino. Up to 15% of added Ancellotta or Malbo Gentile grapes are permitted in the DOC as well. The sweet versions of the wine are typically in the light bodied frizzante style while the drier wines are more full bodied and darker in color.
- Lambrusco Salamino di Santa Croce – located 7 miles (11 km) west of the village Sorbara, the wines of this region must be composed of at least 90% of the local Salamino. The wines are typically light in color and body with a frizzante style being both made in both semi-sweet and dry styles. The variety gets its name from the resemblance of the grape clusters to a sausage of salami.
- Lambrusco di Sorbara – located north of Modena near the village of Sorbara, Sorbara is generally regarded as the highest quality variety producing the most fragrant wines. It has some similarities to Lambrusco Salamino but produces a darker and more full-bodied wine. The color can range from a deep ruby to a purplish hue. In this wine region only Sorbara and Salamino are permitted in the DOC designated wine with at least 60% needing to be Sorbara. The Salamino and Sorbara varieties tend to produce the most acidic wines. One of the reasons why Sorbara tends to produce the highest quality Lambrusco is the tendency of the vine to drop its flowers, which reduces fruit yields and concentrates flavors.
- Casteller – in Trentino, Lambrusco is allowed as a blending grape in the red wine blends of Casteller DOC.

== Other regions ==
In Australia a number of cheaper bottled and box wines are produced by Australian vineyards and sold as "Lambrusco". They are typically medium-sweet, around 10% ABV and styled as an "easy drinking" product.

In Argentina, Lambrusco Maestri accounts for several hundred planted hectares.
