= List of unrefined sweeteners =

This list of unrefined sweeteners includes all natural, unrefined, or low-processed sweeteners.

Sweeteners are usually made from the fruit or sap of plants, but can also be made from any other part of the plant, or all of it. Some sweeteners are made from starch, with the use of enzymes. Sweeteners made by animals, especially insects, are put in their own section as they can come from more than one part of plants.

== From sap ==
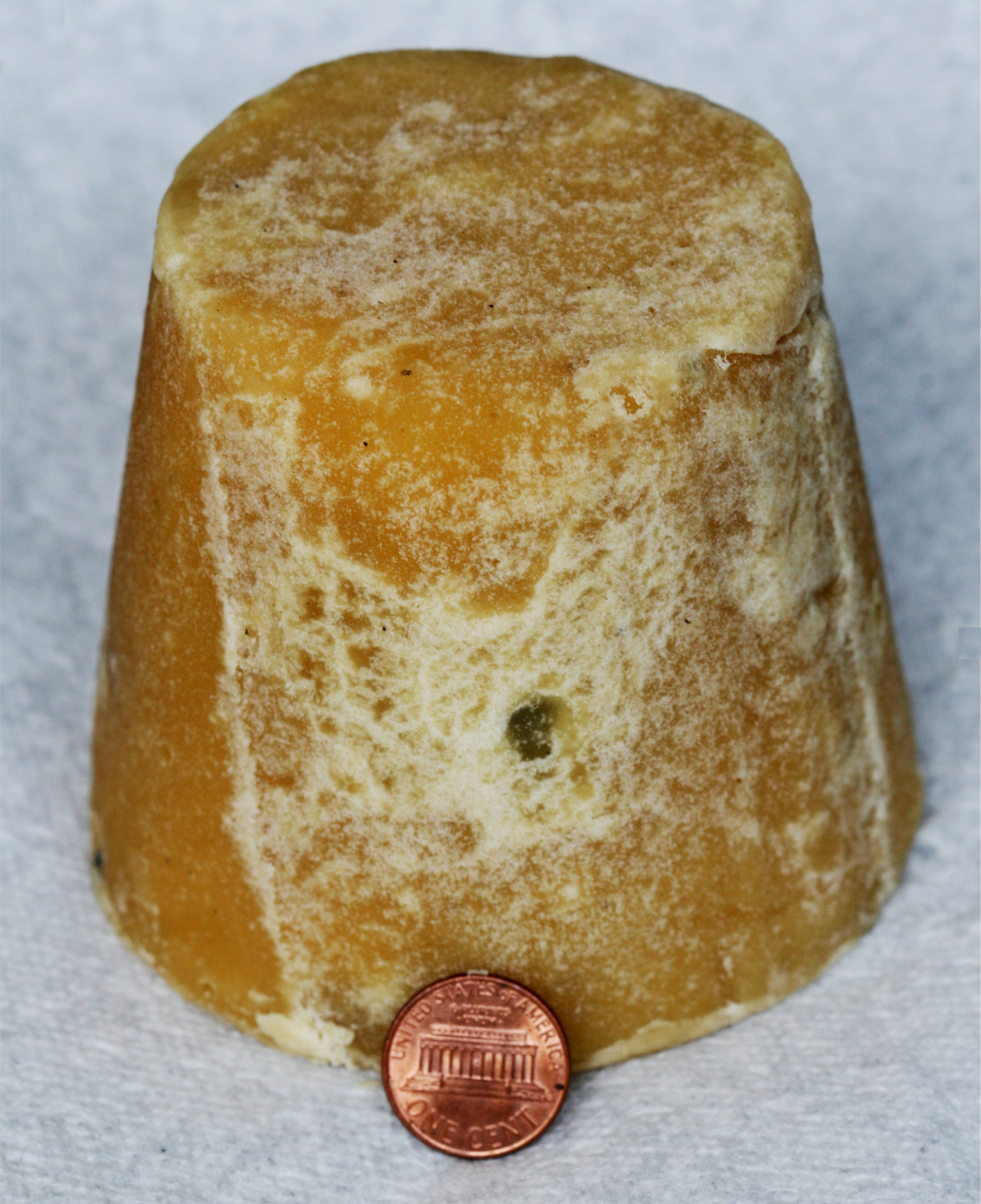
A block of Indian jaggery, a type of raw sugar

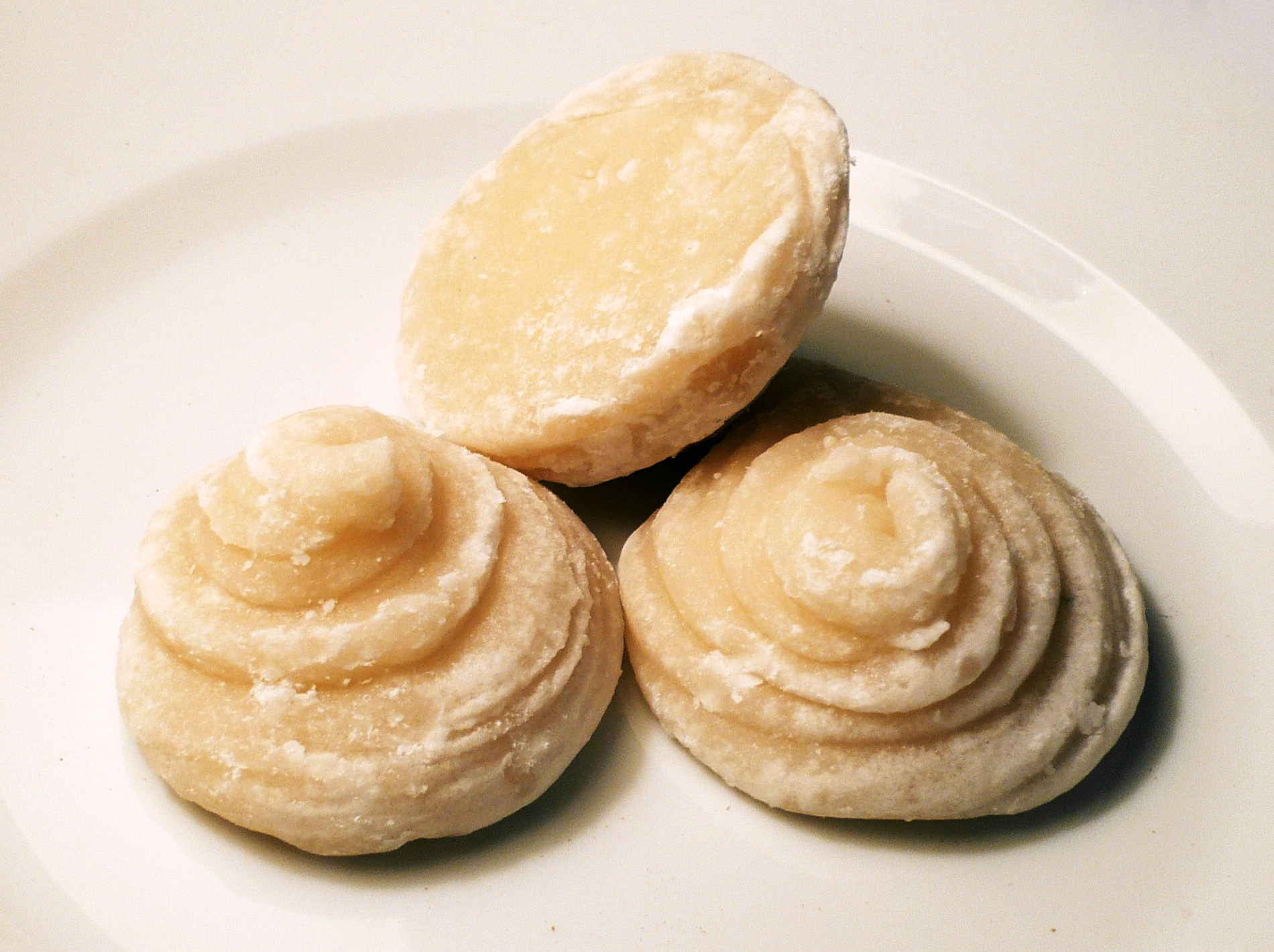
Three cakes of commercially produced palm sugar

The sap of some species is concentrated to make sweeteners, usually through drying or boiling.

- Cane juice, syrup, molasses, and raw sugar, which has many regional and commercial names including demerara, jaggery, muscovado, panela, piloncillo, turbinado sugar, and Sucanat, are all made from sugarcane (Saccharum spp.).
- Sweet sorghum syrup is made from the sugary juice extracted from the stalks of Sorghum spp., especially S. bicolor.
- Mexican or maize sugar can be made by boiling down the juice of green maize stalks.
- Agave nectar is made from the sap of Agave spp., including tequila agave (Agave tequilana).
- Birch syrup is made from the sap of birch trees (Betula spp.).
- Maple syrup, taffy and sugar are made from the sap of tapped maple trees (Acer spp.).
- Walnut syrup, both the white walnut and black walnut can be used to make a sweet syrup.
- Palm sugar is made by tapping the flower stalk of various palm trees to collect the sap. The most important species for this is the Indian date palm (Phoenix sylvestris), but other species used include palmyra (Borassus flabelliformis), coconut (Cocos nucifera), toddy (Caryota urens), gomuti (Arenga saccharifera), and nipa (Nypa fruticans) palms.
- The sweet resin of the sugar pine (Pinus lambertiana) was considered by John Muir to be better than maple sugar.
- A sugary extract from manna ash that contains the sugar mannose and the sugar alcohol mannitol.
- The manna gum produces a sweet, white, crumbly manna from its bark.

== From roots ==
The juice extracted from the tuberous roots of certain plants is, much like sap, concentrated to make sweeteners, usually through drying or boiling.

- Sugar beet syrup (Zuckerrübensirup in German) is made from the tuberous roots of the sugar beet (Beta vulgaris). Sugar beet molasses, a by-product of the processing to make refined sugar, also exists but is mainly used for animal feed.
- Yacón syrup is made from the tuberous roots of yacón (Smallanthus sonchifolius).
- Sweet Cicely root
- Licorice root

== From nectar and flowers ==
- A "palatable" brown sugar can be made by boiling down the dew from flowers of the common milkweed (Asclepias syriaca).
- The nectar of mahua can be used to make a syrup.

== From seeds ==
The starchy seeds of certain plants are transformed into sweeteners by using the enzymes formed during germination or from bacterian cultures. Some sweeteners made with starch are quite refined and made by degrading purified starch with enzymes, such as corn syrup.

- Barley malt syrup is made from germinated barley grains.
- Brown rice malt syrup is made from rice grains cooked and then cultured with malt enzymes.
- Amazake is made from rice fermented with Koji (Aspergillus oryzae).

== From fruits ==
Many fresh fruits, dried fruits and fruit juices are used as sweeteners. Some examples are:

- Carob molasses is made from the pulp of the carob tree's fruit.
- Cider syrup is produced from apples in parts of New England.
- Dates, date paste, spread, syrup ("dibs"), or powder (date sugar) are made from the fruit of the date palm (Phoenix dactylifera).
- Grape syrup is a traditional condiment from the Mediterranean.
- Pomegranate molasses is a Middle Eastern, South Caucasian and Balkan condiment.
- Pumpkin sugar, made by grating the pumpkins, in the same manner as to make beet sugar.
- Monk Fruit is prized for use as a sweetener.
- Watermelon sugar, made by boiling the juice of ripe watermelons.

- Doshab from Armenia can be made from grapes, carob, mulberries, pomegranates or apricots
- Jallab is made by combining grape molasses, dates, carob and rose water.
- Pekmez can be made from grapes, figs, mulberries, carob and juniper; condensed by boiling with coagulant agents.

A wide variety of other fruit syrups are available, such as from pears and pineapples.

== From leaves ==
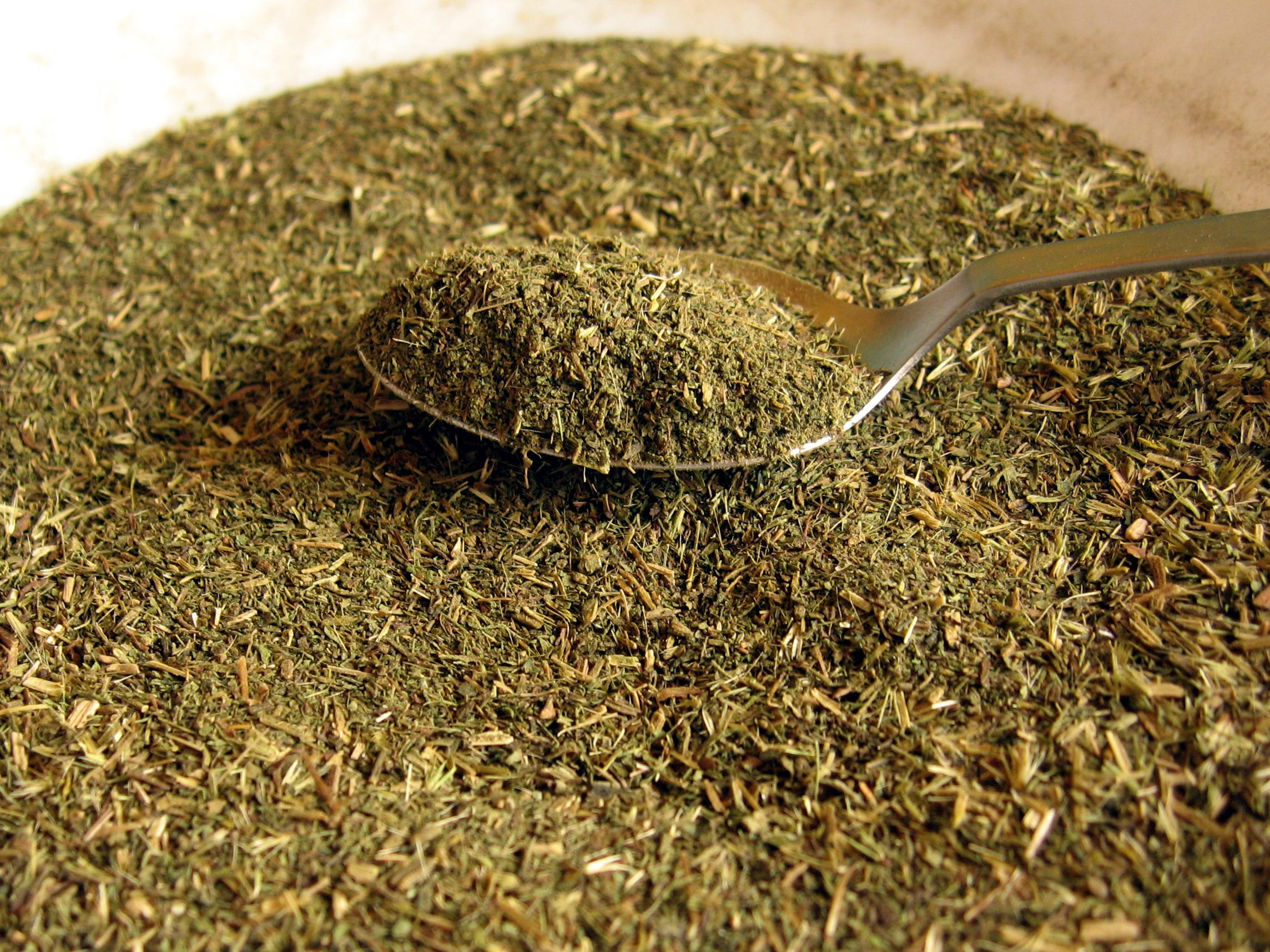
Dried and powdered Stevia leaves

In a few species of plants the leaves are sweet and can be used as sweeteners.

- Stevia spp. can be used whole, or dried and powdered to sweeten food or drink. Uniquely, stevia contains no carbohydrates or calories.
- Jiaogulan (Gynostemma pentaphyllum), has sweet leaves, although not as sweet as Stevia.
- Hydrangea macrophylla Has sweet leaves that are used to make a sweet tea called amacha
- Lippia dulcis Known as Aztec sweet herb, was historically used as a natural sweetener.
- Chinese sweet tea is made from the leaves of the Chinese blackberry, Rubus suavissimus.

== By animals ==
- True honey, made by honey bees (Apis spp.) from gathered nectar.
- Sugarbag, the honey of stingless bees, which is more liquid than the honey from honey bees.

== See also ==
- Australian Aboriginal sweet foods
- Natural brown sugar (some brown sugars are refined)
- List of food additives
- Sugar substitute
- Molasses
