= Qamar al-din =

Apricot-based drink

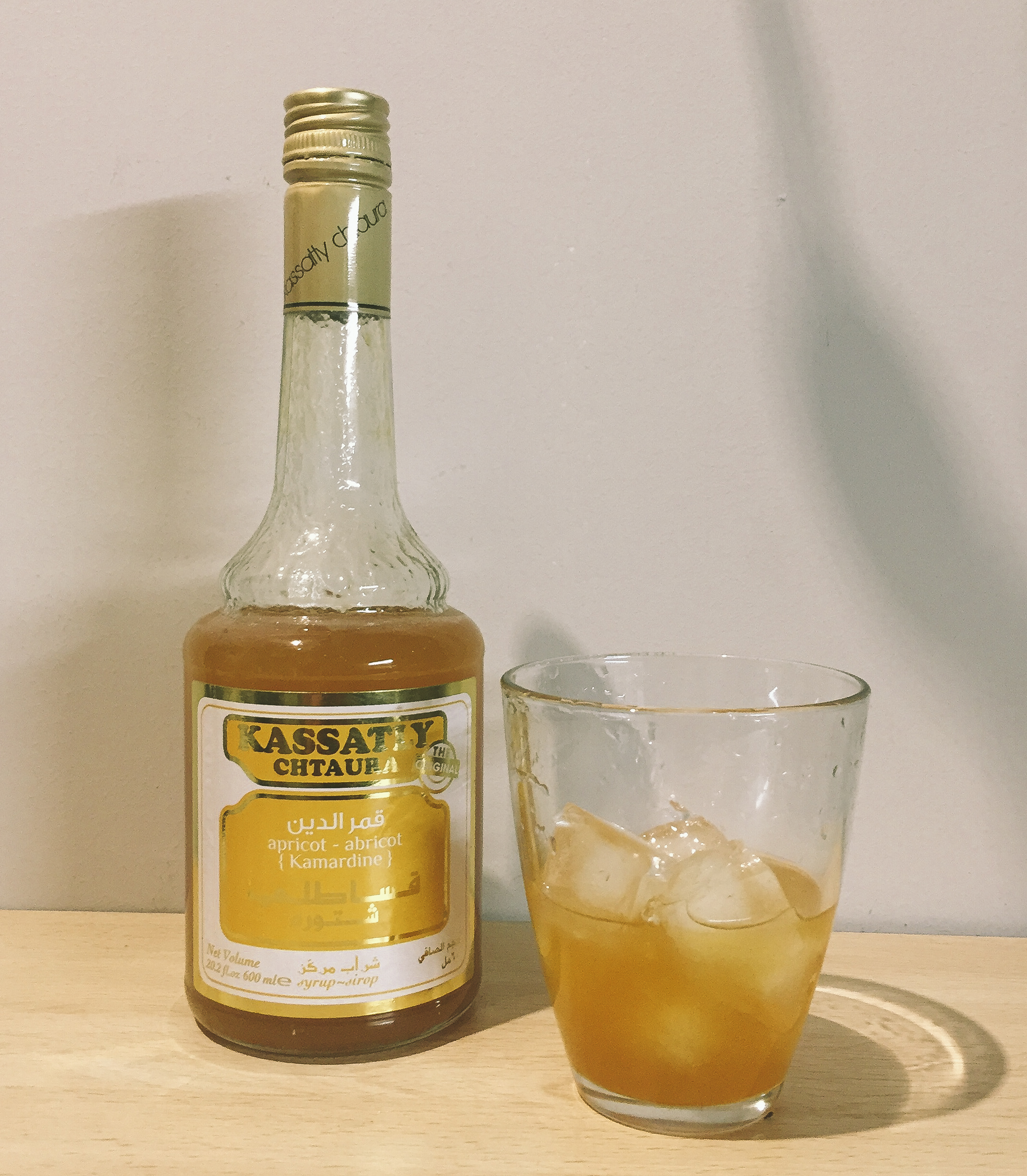
- Type: Drink
- Place of origin: Ghouta, Syria
- Associated cuisine: Levantine, Egyptian, Somali
- Serving temperature: Cold
- Main ingredients: Apricots
- Ingredients generally used: Orange blossom water, sugar
- Food energy (per 100 g serving): 38 kcal (160 kJ)
Nutritional value
(per 100 g serving)
- Protein: 0 g
- Fat: 0 g
- Carbohydrate: 10 g

Qamar al-din (Note: Also transliterated qamar al-deen, qamar ad-din/ad-deen, qamar eddine, qamaruddin, kamaruddin, amardine, amar eddin, and a myriad of other ways. Transliteration of Arabic is notoriously fraught with challenges, even before differences between Arabic's many dialects are taken into account.) (Arabic: قمر الدين, lit. 'Moon of the Faith') is an apricot fruit leather used to make apricot juice or a nectar beverage often consumed during the Muslim holy month of Ramadan. It is specifically mentioned in a 13th-century Levantine recipe. It originates from what is now Syria, and was first produced in the Ghouta, where the variety of apricots most suitable for qamar al-din was first grown. Qamar al-din is used across the Middle East and North Africa and Somalia, though Syrian qamar al-din is still believed to be the best because the variety of apricots most suitable for making qamar al-din grows only in Syria and southwestern Turkey.

== Etymology ==
Several theories have been proposed for the origin of qamar al-din's name. One theory holds that it was named for its inventor, a Syrian man named Qamar al-Din. He was said to have been so handsome that he resembled the moon (Arabic: قمر, romanized: qamar), hence his name.

Another theory holds that apricot season coincided with the sighting of the new moon marking the beginning of Ramadan in the year when qamar al-din was invented. A similar theory, widespread in Egypt, traces the name's origin to a Caliph who was known to celebrate with qamar al-din upon seeing the crescent moon during Ramadan.

== History ==
Writings by medieval explorer Ibn Battuta mention a variety of apricot called qamar al-din, which were said to be cultivated in the Levant and Byzantium, dried, and exported elsewhere.

According to historian Daniel Newman, Qamar al-Din is mentioned a 13-Century Arabic cookbook as a cooking ingredient, but no recipe for it was provided. A recipe for the fruit leather was provided in 1599 within a medical handbook by physician Dawud al-Antaki.

== Method of preparation ==
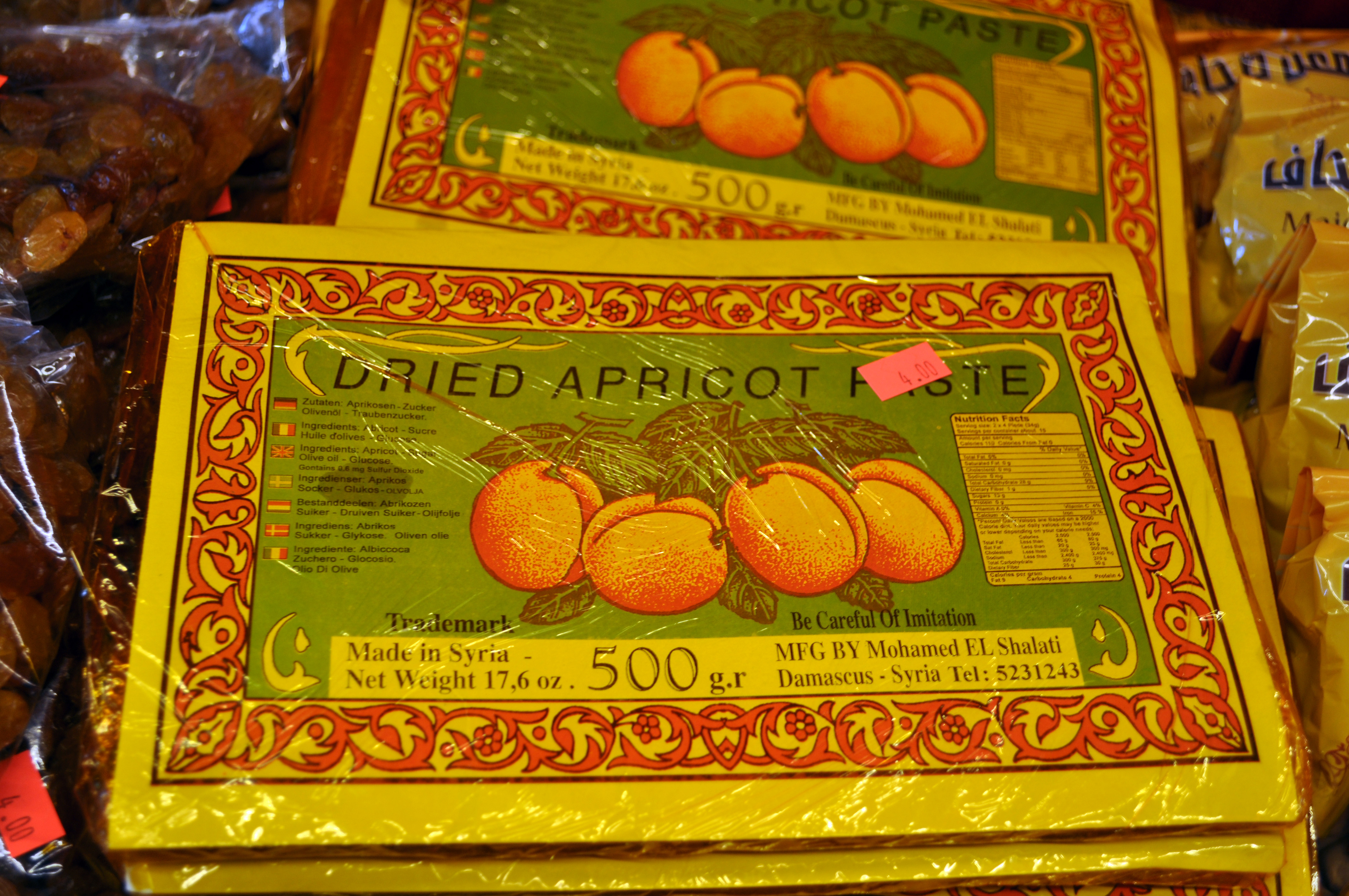
Dried apricot paste for making Qamar Addin

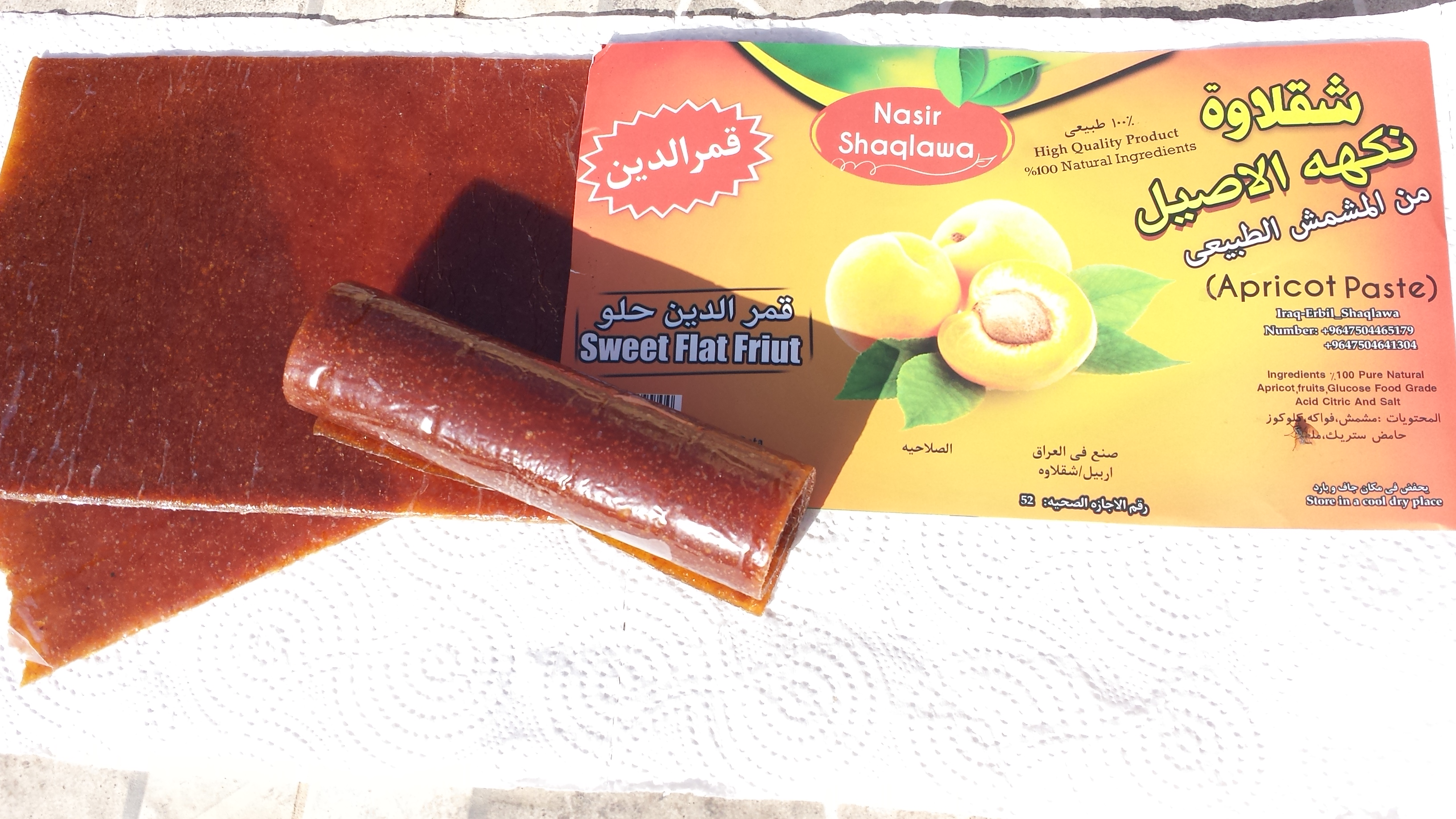
Iraqi-made qamar al-din fruit leather and package

To produce Qamar al-din, apricots and sugar are boiled over a fire and then strained through a wooden strainer that is soaked in olive oil. The apricots are then left to dry in direct sunlight. Once it has completely dried, it is then packaged, shipped, and sold. This dried apricot leather is thicker, more consistent, and has a stronger flavor than ordinary apricot leather, and is thus more suitable for making qamar al-din. Making the drink from this apricot leather only requires adding rosewater or orange blossom water, though apricot pieces (fresh or dried) and ice are often added as well. Sometimes, some of the floral water is replaced with orange juice or plain water.

== Consumption ==
Qamar al-din is traditionally served thick and cold, and it is believed to be especially fortifying and a good source of energy, electrolytes, and hydration, all of which are crucial after a day of fasting. Some in the Levant add pine nuts and ice to their qamar al-din, making a beverage that resembles a thicker, apricot-flavored version of jallab.

In Syria, it is also casually eaten without being turned into a drink, as the fruit roll is a snack itself. A common variation is wrapping the fruit leather around a piece of walnut.

Qamar al-Din is consumed all across the Arab World, including the Maghreb region.

Qamar al-Din is used to make muhallebi pudding, this pudding is popular during Ramadan in the Levant, as well as Egypt. It is also used to flavor ice cream.

== See also ==
- Erk al sous
- Jallab
- Kharoub
- Tamr hindi
- Levantine cuisine
