= Fruit syrup =

Concentrated fruit juices

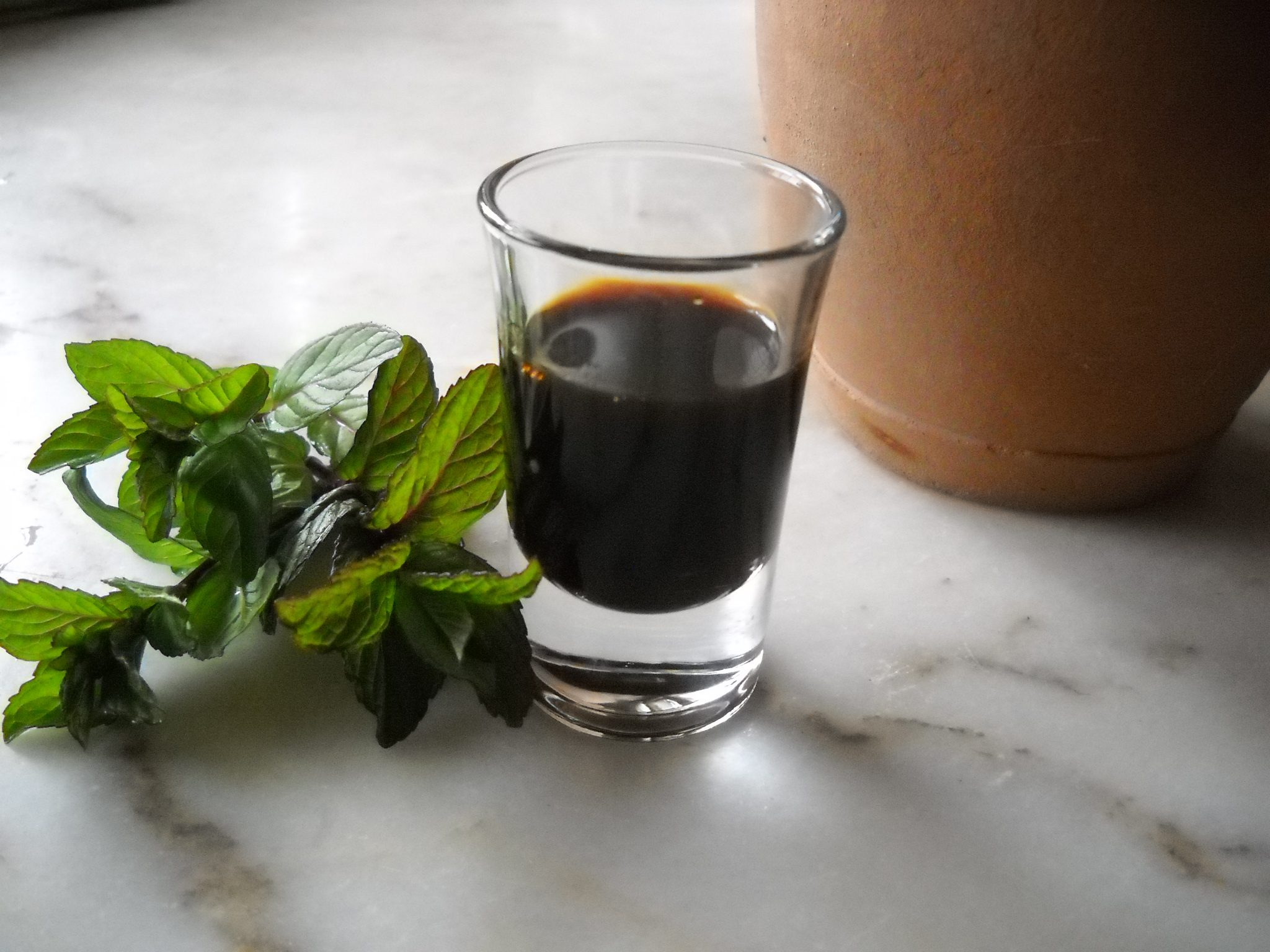
Pekmez/Doshab, a syrup made of grapes (grape syrup) and other fruits.

Fruit syrups or fruit molasses are concentrated fruit juices used as sweeteners.

Examples include pomegranate molasses, grape syrup, and boiled cider.

Fruit syrups are known by a variety of names in multiple cuisines, including:

- in Arab cuisine, rub, jallab;
- in Ancient Greek cuisine, epsima;
- in Greek cuisine, petimezi;
- in Indian cuisine, drakshasava;
- in Turkish cuisine, pekmez;
- in Persian cuisine, doshab;
- in Ancient Roman cuisine, defrutum, carenum, and sapa.
- in Armenian cuisine, doshab.

Some foods are made using fruit syrups or molasses:

- Churchkhela, a sausage-shaped candy made from grape must and nuts
- Sharots, a confection in Armenian cuisine, consisting of halved walnut kernels threaded onto a string and coated with a spiced grape-based mixture

In modern industrial foods, they are often made from a less expensive fruit (such as apples, pears, or pineapples) and used to sweeten more expensive fruits or products and to extend their quantity. A typical use would be for an "all-fruit" strawberry spread that contains apple juice as well as strawberries.

== See also ==
- Cheong
- Grape syrup
- List of syrups
- Squash (drink)
