= Barley malt syrup =

Food additive

Adding barley malt syrup to flour aids browning, adds flavor, and speeds the proofing process

Barley malt syrup is an unrefined sweetener processed by extraction from sprouted, malted barley.

Barley malt syrup contains approximately 65 percent maltose, 30 percent complex carbohydrates, and 3 percent storage protein (prolamin glycoprotein). Malt syrup is dark brown, thick, and sticky, and possesses a strong distinctive flavor described as "malty". It is about half as sweet as refined white sugar. Barley malt syrup is sometimes used in combination with other natural sweeteners to lend a malt flavor. It is also called "barley malt extract" (or just malt syrup), though there are instances of mislabeling "extract" where additional grains or corn syrup are used in production.

Barley malt extract is also sold in powdered form, used in the bread and baked good industry for browning and flavoring, in cereal manufacture to add malt flavor, and in place of or addition to malted milk in malted drinks and candy. Adding barley malt syrup to yeast dough increases fermentation as a result of the enzymes in the malt, thus quickening the proofing process.

Barley malt syrup has a long history, and was one of the primary sweeteners (along with honey) in use in China in the years 1000 BCE – 1000 CE. Qimin Yaoshu, a classic 6th century Chinese text, contains notes on the extraction of malt syrup and maltose from common household grains. Barley malt syrup continues to be used in traditional Chinese sweets, such as Chinese cotton candy.

Sugar rationing in the US during World War I led to the first commercial malt syrup production in the 1920s.

Malt loaf is another product that makes use of barley malt syrup.

== See also ==
- Brewing
- List of syrups
- List of unrefined sweeteners
- Malted milk
