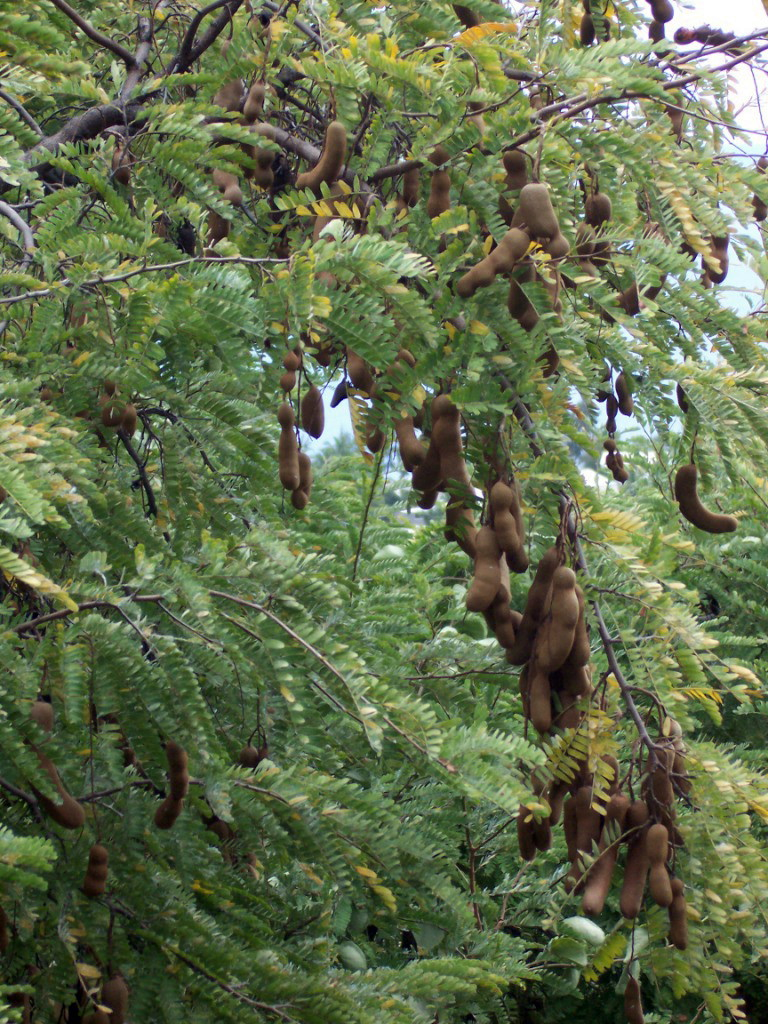

Conservation status
- Least Concern (IUCN 3.1)

Scientific classification
- Kingdom: Plantae
- Clade: Tracheophytes
- Clade: Angiosperms
- Clade: Eudicots
- Clade: Rosids
- Order: Fabales
- Family: Fabaceae
- Subfamily: Detarioideae
- Tribe: Amherstieae
- Genus: Tamarindus; L.
- Species: T. indica

Binomial name
- Tamarindus indica L. 1753

Synonyms
- Cavaraea Speg. 1916; Cavaraea elegans Speg. 1916; Tamarindus erythraeus Mattei 1908; Tamarindus occidentalis Gaertn. 1791; Tamarindus officinalis Hook. 1851; Tamarindus somalensis Matteqi 1908; Tamarindus umbrosa Salisb. 1796

= Tamarind =

Leguminous tree bearing edible fruit

Tamarind (Tamarindus indica) is a leguminous tree bearing edible fruit that is indigenous to tropical Africa and naturalized in Asia. The genus Tamarindus is monotypic, meaning that it contains only this species. It belongs to the family Fabaceae.

The tamarind tree produces brown, pod-like fruits that contain a sweet, tangy pulp, which is used in cuisines around the world. The pulp is also used in traditional medicine and as a dye. The wood can be used for woodworking, and tamarind seed oil can be extracted from the seeds. Its young leaves are used in Indian and Filipino cuisine. Because tamarind has multiple uses, it is cultivated worldwide in tropical and subtropical zones.

== Description ==
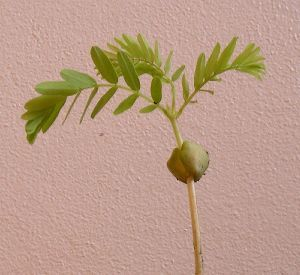
Seedling

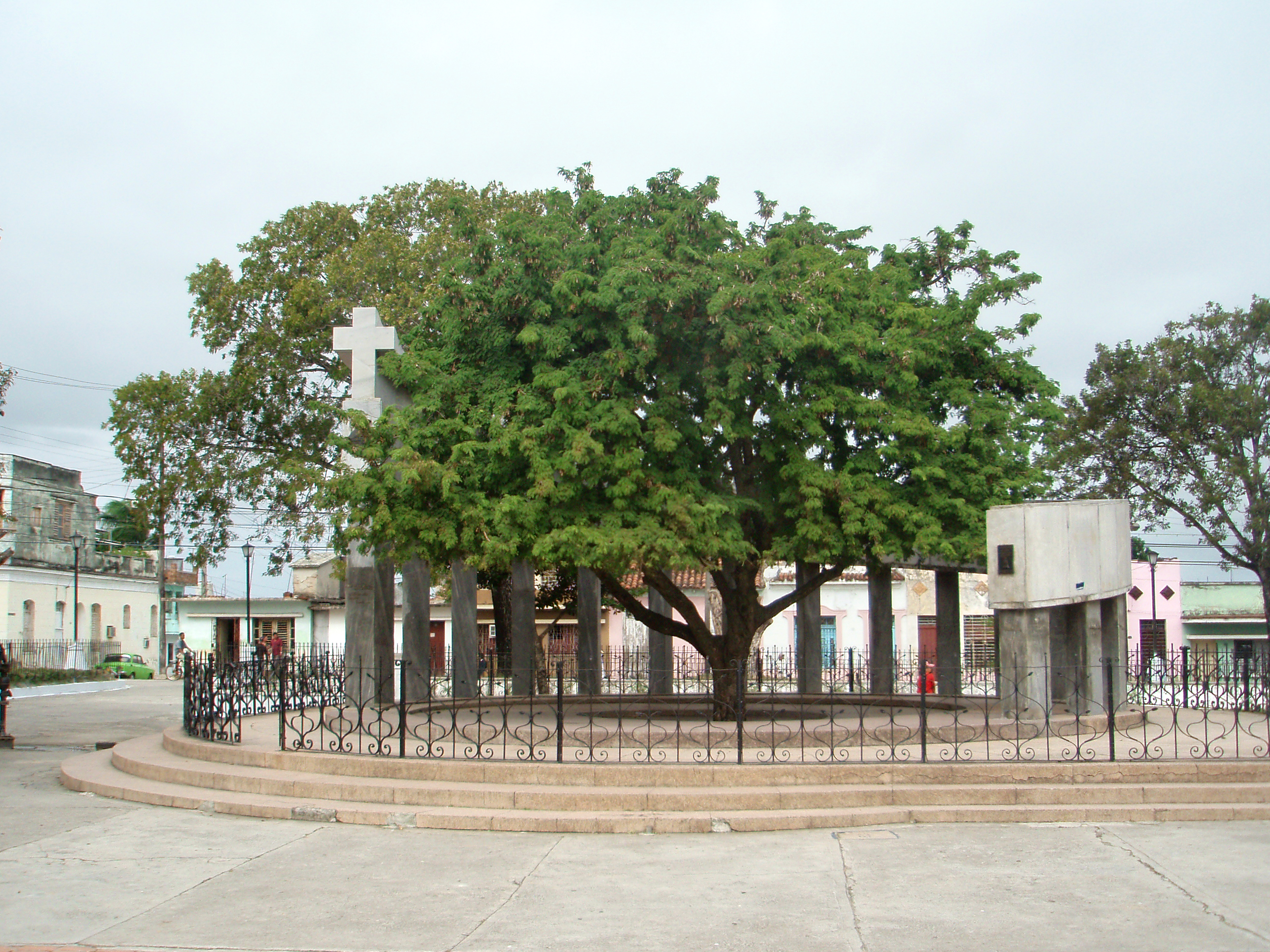
Trees

The tamarind is a long-living, medium-growth tree, which attains a maximum crown height of 25–30 metres (82–98 feet). The crown has an irregular, vase-shaped outline of dense foliage up to 12 m (39 ft) wide. A tamarind trunk may grow to a circumference of 7.5 m (25 ft). The tree grows well in full sun. It prefers clay, loam, sandy, and acidic soil types, with a high resistance to drought and wind-borne salt as found in coastal areas. Tamarind timber consists of hard, dark red heartwood and softer, yellowish sapwood.

The evergreen leaves are alternately arranged and paripinnately compound. The leaflets are bright green, elliptic-ovular, pinnately veined, and less than 15 centimetres (6 inches) in length. The branches droop from a single, central trunk as the tree matures, and are often pruned in agriculture to optimize tree density and ease of fruit harvest. As a tropical species, it is frost-sensitive.

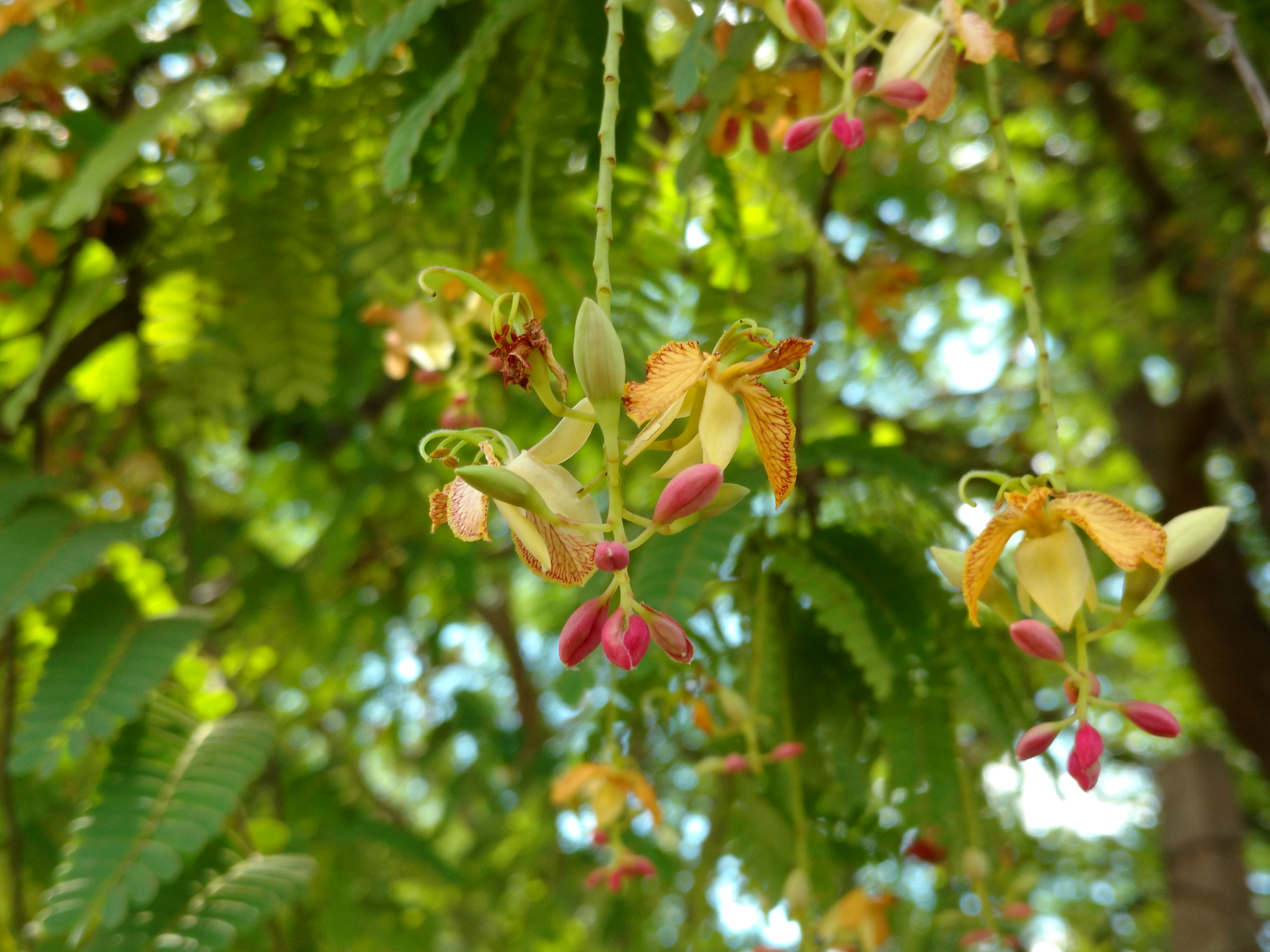
Tamarind flowers from long racemes

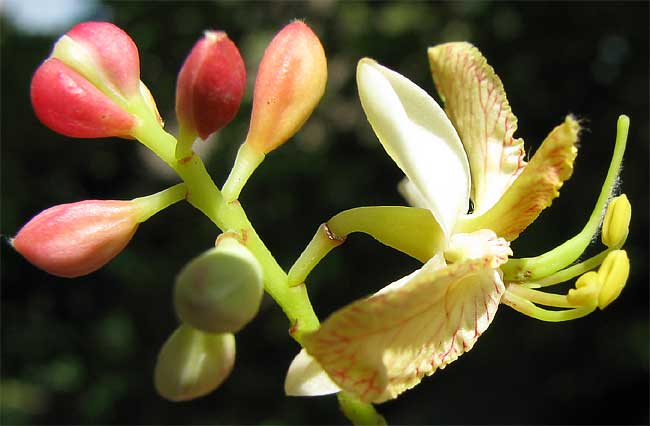
Flowers

The tamarind flowers bloom (although inconspicuously), with red and yellow elongated flowers. Flowers are 2.5 cm (1 in) wide, five-petalled, borne in small racemes, and yellow with orange or red streaks. The individual flower is covered in a bud by four pink sepals which are lost when the flower blooms.

=== Fruit ===
The fruit is an indehiscent pod, 12 to 15 cm (4 1/2 to 6 in) in length, with a hard, brown shell.

The tamarinds of Asia have longer pods (containing six to 12 seeds), whereas African and West Indian varieties have shorter pods (containing one to six seeds). A mature tree may produce up to 225 kg (496 lb) of fruit each year. The fruit has a fleshy, acidic pulp, becoming mature when the flesh is colored brown or reddish brown; the pulp is sweet and sour in taste. The brown seeds left behind are somewhat flattened, and glossy.

== Genomics ==
A gap-free telomere-to-telomere genome assembly of Tamarindus indica was published in 2025. The genome size is approximately 809.5 Mb, assembled across 12 pseudochromosomes. The assembly has a BUSCO completeness of 98.8%, and 30,753 protein-coding genes were predicted.

== Etymology ==
The name derives from Arabic: تمر هندي, romanized tamr hindi, "Indian date". Several early medieval herbalists and physicians wrote tamar indi, medieval Latin use was tamarindus, and Marco Polo wrote of tamarandi.

=== Common names ===
In countries of Southeast Asia, it is called asam jawa (Javanese sour fruit) or simply asam, and sukaer in Timor. In the Philippines, it is called sampalok or sampaloc in Filipino, and sambag in Cebuano. In Thailand, it is called makham (Thai: มะขาม). In Hindi, it is known as imli (Hindi: इमली) or tintrini (Hindi: तिन्त्रिणी), and as chincha in Marathi (Marathi: चिंच).

== Distribution ==
Tamarindus indica is indigenous to tropical Africa, where botanical studies place its native domestication within the dry savannas of the Sudanian belt, extending from Sudan, especially Kordofan, westward across sub-Sahelian Africa. It has been cultivated for so long on the Indian subcontinent that it is sometimes reported to be indigenous there. It grows wild in Africa. In Arabia, it is found growing wild in Oman, especially Dhofar, where it grows on the sea-facing slopes of mountains. It reached South Asia likely through human transportation and cultivation several thousand years ago. It is widely distributed throughout the tropics, from Africa to South Asia and Australia. In Madagascar, its fruit and leaves are a well-known favorite of the ring-tailed lemur, providing as much as 50 percent of their food resources during the year if available.

In the 16th century, it was introduced to Mexico and Central America, and to a lesser degree to South America, by Spanish and Portuguese colonists, to the degree that it became a staple ingredient in the region's cuisine.

== Uses ==
Tamarinds, raw
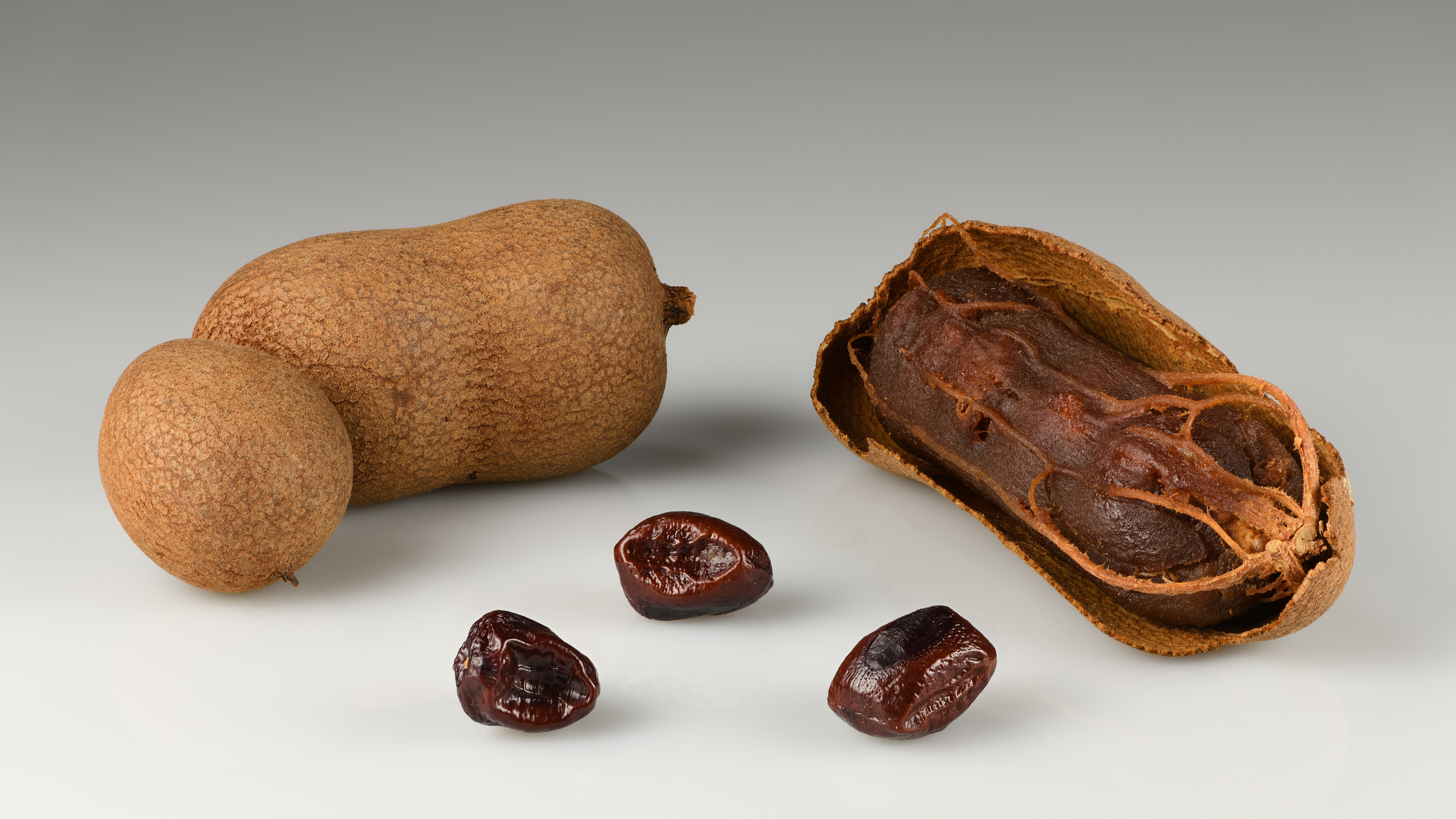

Nutritional value per 100 g (3.5 oz)
- Energy: 1,000 kJ (240 kcal)
- Carbohydrates: 62.5 g
- Sugars: 57.4
- Dietary fiber: 5.1 g
- Fat: 0.6 g
- Saturated: 0.272 g
- Monounsaturated: 0.181 g
- Polyunsaturated: 0.059 g
- Protein: 2.8 g
Vitamins and minerals
Vitamins	Quantity %DV^{†}
Vitamin A equiv.	0% 2 μg
Vitamin A	30 IU
Thiamine (B1)	36% 0.428 mg
Riboflavin (B2)	12% 0.152 mg
Niacin (B3)	12% 1.938 mg
Pantothenic acid (B5)	3% 0.143 mg
Vitamin B6	4% 0.066 mg
Folate (B9)	4% 14 μg
Choline	2% 8.6 mg
Vitamin C	4% 3.5 mg
Vitamin E	1% 0.1 mg
Vitamin K	2% 2.8 μg
Minerals	Quantity %DV^{†}
Calcium	6% 74 mg
Copper	10% 0.086 mg
Iron	16% 2.8 mg
Magnesium	22% 92 mg
Phosphorus	9% 113 mg
Potassium	21% 628 mg
Selenium	2% 1.3 μg
Sodium	1% 28 mg
Zinc	1% 0.1 mg
- Other constituents: Quantity
- Water: 31.40 g
- Full entry in FoodData Central database
- ^{†}Percentages estimated using US recommendations for adults, except for potassium, which is estimated based on expert recommendation from the National Academies.

Most parts of the tamarind tree (including the wood, bark, flowers, leaves, pulp and seeds) have various environmental, commercial, and culinary uses. Tamarind trees are used as shade trees and ornamental trees (common along highways and in parks).

=== Nutrition ===
Raw tamarind fruit is 63% carbohydrates, 31% water, 3% protein, and 1% fat (table). In a reference amount of 100 g (3.5 oz), raw tamarind supplies 1,000 kilojoules (240 kilocalories) of food energy, and is a rich source (20% or more of the Daily Value, DV) of thiamine (36% DV) and dietary minerals, including magnesium and potassium at 22% and 21% DV, respectively (table).

=== Culinary ===
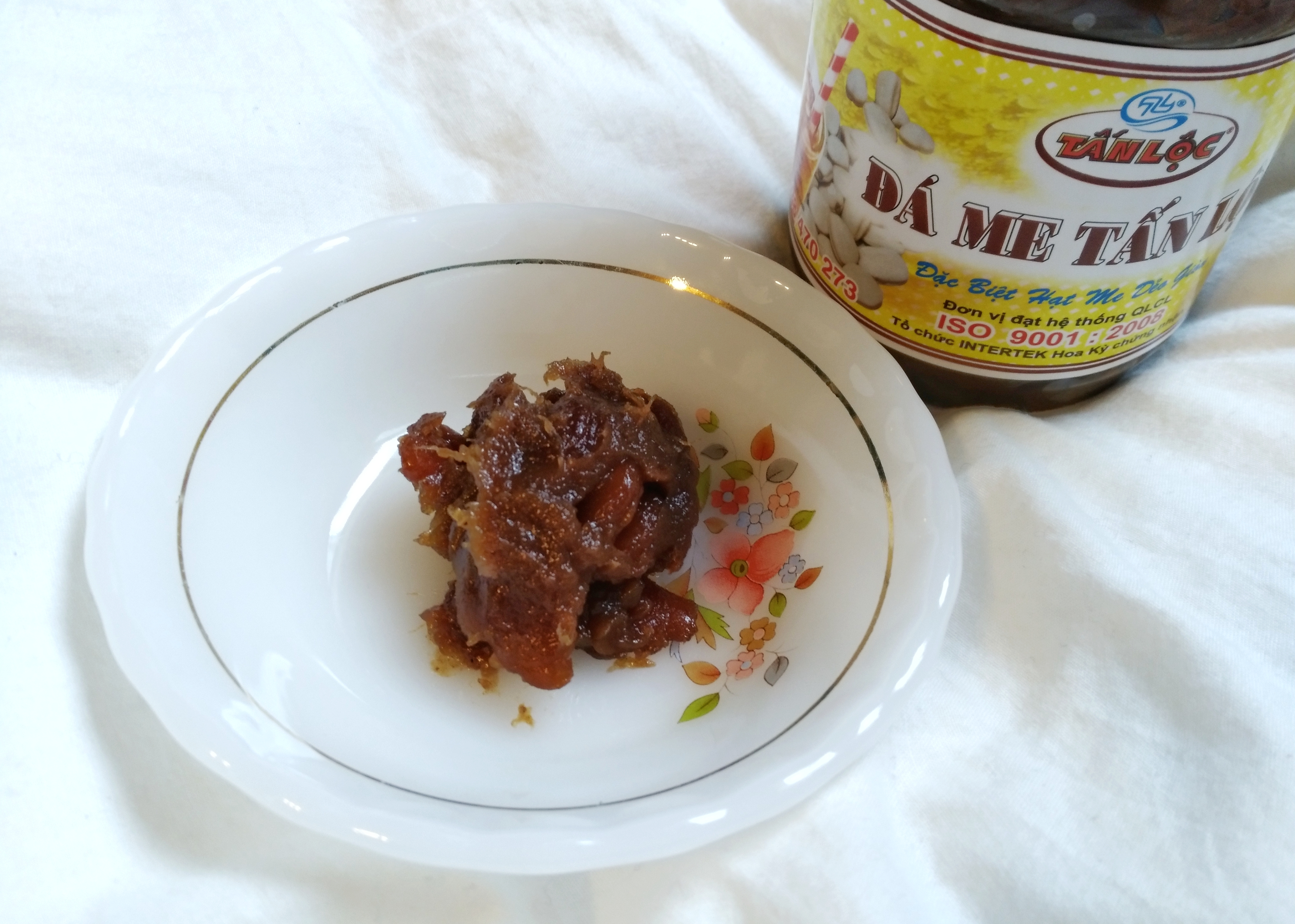
Tamarind paste from a jar

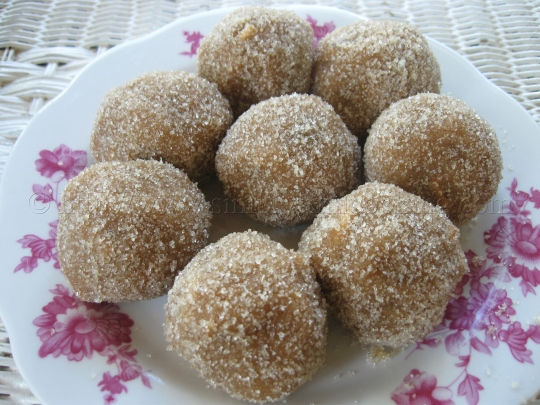
Tamarind balls

The fruit is harvested by pulling the pod from its stalk. The hard green pulp of a young fruit is used in savory dishes, as a pickling agent or as a means of making certain poisonous yams in Ghana safe for human consumption. As the fruit matures, it becomes sweeter and less sour (acidic). The sourness varies between cultivars and some sweet varieties have almost no acidity when ripe.

Tamarind pulp is the most common part of the tamarind plant used in chutneys, curries, and sauces, such as Worcestershire sauce, HP Sauce, some brands of barbecue sauce, and the traditional sharbat syrup drink. Tamarind sweet chutney is common in India and Pakistan as a dressing for many snacks and often served with samosa.

Across the Middle East, from the Levant to Iran, tamarind is used in savory dishes, notably meat-based stews, and often combined with dried fruits to achieve a sweet-sour tang. During Ramadan, tamarind is used to prepare a traditional beverage known as "tamr-hindi," which is particularly popular in the Levant region. The drink is made by boiling tamarind paste in water, sweetening it with sugar, and then straining the mixture. In some variations, rosewater and lemon juice are added to enhance its flavor. Street vendors play a significant role in distributing this beverage, carrying large copper pots filled with the juice on their backs. They typically arrange numerous cups around their waist to conveniently serve the drink to passersby in the streets.

Tamarind has been integrated into kosher and Jewish cuisine across several diasporas, beginning with its introduction to the Middle East via Jewish merchants on the Silk Road in the 7th century. Syrian Jews prepare tamarind syrup, known as ou or ouc, by soaking, straining, and boiling the fruit pulp with sugar and lemon, using it in dishes such as yebra (stuffed grape leaves), bazargan (bulgur salad), keftes (sweet-sour meatballs), and laham b'ajeen (meat flatbread). In India, Baghdadi, Cochin, and Bene Israel Jews use tamarind in regional recipes like bamia khutta, mahmoora, tamarind rice, and lamb with red chilies. Syrian Jewish communities in Mexico have adapted tamarind-based dishes with local ingredients, exemplified by chicken with tamarind, apricots, and chipotle. In contemporary Israel, tamarind juice has gained popularity beyond traditional communities, aided by commercial offerings like Prigat's seasonal releases during Ramadan.

In the Philippines, the whole fruit is used as one of the souring agents of the sour soup sinigang (which can also use other sour fruits), as well as another type of soup called sinampalukan (which uses tamarind leaves). The fruit pulp is cooked in sugar and salt to make champóy na sampalok (or simply "sampalok candy"), a traditional tamarind candy. A similar method is used in Mexican and Hispanic communities to create tamarind candy and various other confections. Its spicy and sweet flavor is valued in Mexican culture. An example of this is the popular Pulparindo candy. Indonesia also has a similarly sour, tamarind-based soup dish called sayur asem.

In Sri Lanka, tamarind pulp has been used as a lime alternative, and in Senegal, the pulp is mixed with sugar to produce sweet meats known as 'Bengal'. In India, tamarind pulp is made into a juice used in the preservation of fish, and in many countries of East Africa, the pulp is used in the making of a dish called ugali (a type of maize flour porridge).

Tamarind seeds need to be soaked and boiled in water before they are edible. The seeds are commonly used in jellies, marmalades and jams because they contain pectin, which gives them jelly-forming properties, and have been used as a stabilizer to make cheese, ice cream, and mayonnaise. In Indonesia, after the seeds have been roasted, they are consumed as a snack accompanied with salt and grated coconut, and in Thailand, tamarind seeds are used as a coffee alternative.

The leaves and bark are also edible, and the seeds can be cooked to make them safe for consumption. Blanched, tender tamarind leaves are used in a Burmese salad called magyi ywet thoke (lit. 'tamarind leaf salad'), a salad from Upper Myanmar that features tender blanched tamarind leaves, garlic, onions, roasted peanuts, and pounded dried shrimp. Tamarind seeds contain high levels of protein (26.9 grams per 100 grams) and oil (10.9 grams per 100 grams) and in some countries, tamarind seeds are used as an emergency food because of their high protein levels. The leaves of the tamarind plant are high in calcium and protein and have been consumed by domestic animals and wild animals, including elephants, as a fodder.

=== Seed oil and kernel powder ===
Tamarind seed oil is made from the kernel of tamarind seeds. The kernel is difficult to isolate from its thin but tough shell (or testa). It has a similar consistency to linseed oil, and can be used to make paint or varnish.

Tamarind kernel powder is used as sizing material for textile and jute processing, and in the manufacture of industrial gums and adhesives.

Tamarind seeds are used in the production of tamarind kernel powder which is used as a sizing agent in the textile industry because of its ability to absorb water and swell up, in India, tamarind kernel powder has also been used as a sizing agent in the production of cotton. In Bengal, tamarind seeds are used in the production of an oil used in varnishes. leaves and flowers are used as a setting agent for dyes.

Composition of tamarind seed kernel
Composition	Original	De-oiled
Oil	7.6%	0.6%
Protein	7.6%	19.0%
Polysaccharide	51.0%	55.0%
Crude fiber	1.2%	1.1%
Total ash	3.9%	3.4%
Acid insoluble ash	0.4%	0.3%
Moisture	7.1%	
The fatty acid composition of the oil is linoleic 46.5%, oleic 27.2%, and saturated fatty acids 26.4%. The oil is usually bleached after refining.

Fatty acid composition of tamarind kernel oil
Fatty acid	(%) Range reported
Lauric acid (C12:0)	tr-0.3
Myristic acid (C14:0)	tr-0.4
Palmitic acid (C16:0)	8.7–14.8
Stearic acid (C18:0)	4.4–6.6
Arachidic acid (C20:0)	3.7–12.2
Lignoceric acid (C24:0)	4.0–22.3
Oleic acid (C18:1)	19.6–27.0
Linoleic acid (18:2)	7.5–55.4
Linolenic acid (C18:3)	2.8–5.6

=== Folk medicine ===
In Southeast Asia, tamarind fruit is used as a poultice applied to the foreheads of people with fevers. The fruit exhibits laxative effects for relief of constipation. Extracts of steamed and sun-dried old tamarind pulp (asem kawa) in Java are used to treat skin problems, like rashes and irritation; one traditional practice indicated tamarind could be ingested after dilution for use as an abortifacient.

Different parts of the tamarind plant have been used globally for other purposes in folk medicine. In the northern parts of Nigeria, the roots of the tamarind plant are thought to be useful for treating leprosy, and in America, tamarind pulp is considered in folk medicine to be a laxative and used for alleviating sunstroke and sore throats. In Thailand, the pulp has been transformed into a tablet in the belief it can reduce excess weight, and in Brazil, the pulp is used for its supposed hydrating effects. Tamarind seeds have been used in powdered form to possibly aid dysentery in India and Cambodia, and in Ethiopia, softened tamarind seeds are used as a possible treatment for parasitic worms.

=== Woodworking ===
Tamarind wood is used to make furniture, boats (as per Rumphius) carvings, turned objects such as mortars and pestles, chopping blocks, and other small specialty wood items like krises. Tamarind heartwood is reddish brown, sometimes with a purplish hue. The heartwood in tamarind tends to be narrow and is usually only present in older and larger trees. The pale yellow sapwood is sharply demarcated from the heartwood. Heartwood is said to be durable to very durable in decay resistance, and is also resistant to insects. Its sapwood is not durable and is prone to attack by insects and fungi as well as spalting. Due to its density and interlocked grain, tamarind is considered difficult to work. Heartwood has a pronounced blunting effect on cutting edges. Tamarind turns, glues, and finishes well. The heartwood is able to take a high natural polish.

=== Metal polish ===
In homes and temples, especially in Buddhist Asian countries including Myanmar, the fruit pulp is used to polish brass shrine statues and lamps, and copper, brass, and bronze utensils.

=== As tanning material ===
Ground tamarind leaves applied to raw goat leather can have tanning properties taking up less amount of salt used in drying them than ordinary processing.

=== Leaf compounds ===
Lupeol, catechins, quercetin, isorhamnetin, and various other polyphenols are present in the leaf extract.

== Cultivation ==
Seeds can be scarified or briefly boiled to enhance germination. They retain their germination capability for several months if kept dry.

Tamarind is a traditional food plant in Africa. Although not grown on a large-scale commercial basis, it has the potential to improve nutrition, boost food security, foster rural development, and support sustainable land care.

The tree is widely cultivated across India, especially in Maharashtra, Chhattisgarh, Karnataka, Telangana, Andhra Pradesh, and Tamil Nadu. Extensive tamarind orchards in India produced 250,000 tonnes (250,000 long tons; 280,000 short tons) annually in the late 20th century. It has long been naturalized in Indonesia, Malaysia, Sri Lanka, the Philippines, the Caribbean, and Pacific Islands. Thailand has the largest plantations of the ASEAN nations, followed by Indonesia, Myanmar, and the Philippines. In parts of Southeast Asia, tamarind is called asam.

In the United States, it is a large-scale crop introduced for commercial use (second in net production quantity only to India), mainly in southern states, notably south Florida, and as a shade tree, along roadsides, in dooryards and in parks.

=== Horticulture ===
Throughout South Asia and the tropical world, tamarind trees are used as ornamental and garden plantings. Commonly used as a bonsai species in many Asian countries, it is also grown as an indoor bonsai in temperate parts of the world.

== In dogs ==
Tamarind is toxic to dogs, with potential for causing acute kidney injury. The symptoms—which may include vomiting or diarrhea within 6–12 hours of ingestion, lethargy, or dehydration—and proposed mechanism (via tartaric acid) are the same as in grape toxicity in dogs.

== Gallery ==
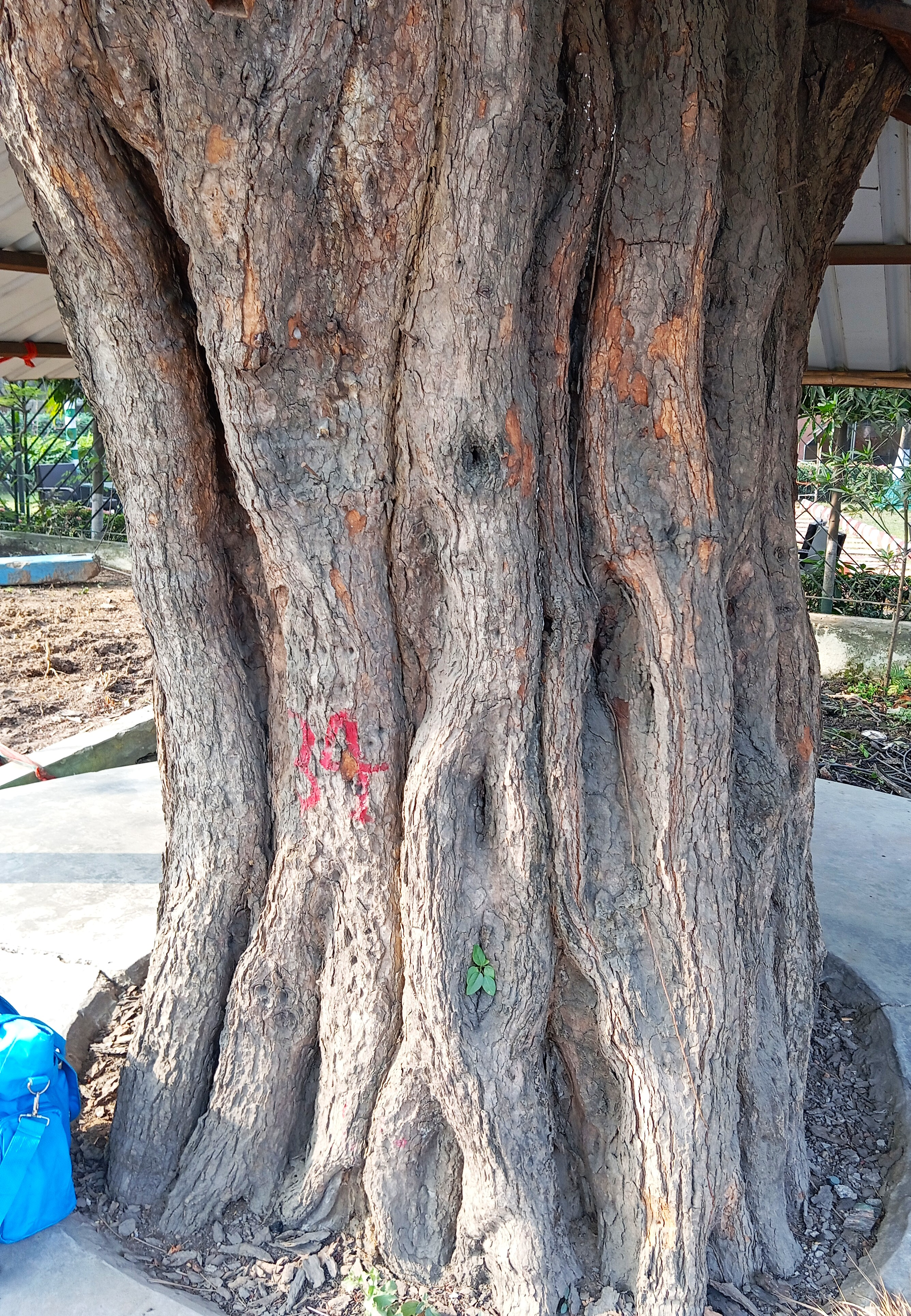
Tamarind tree trunk

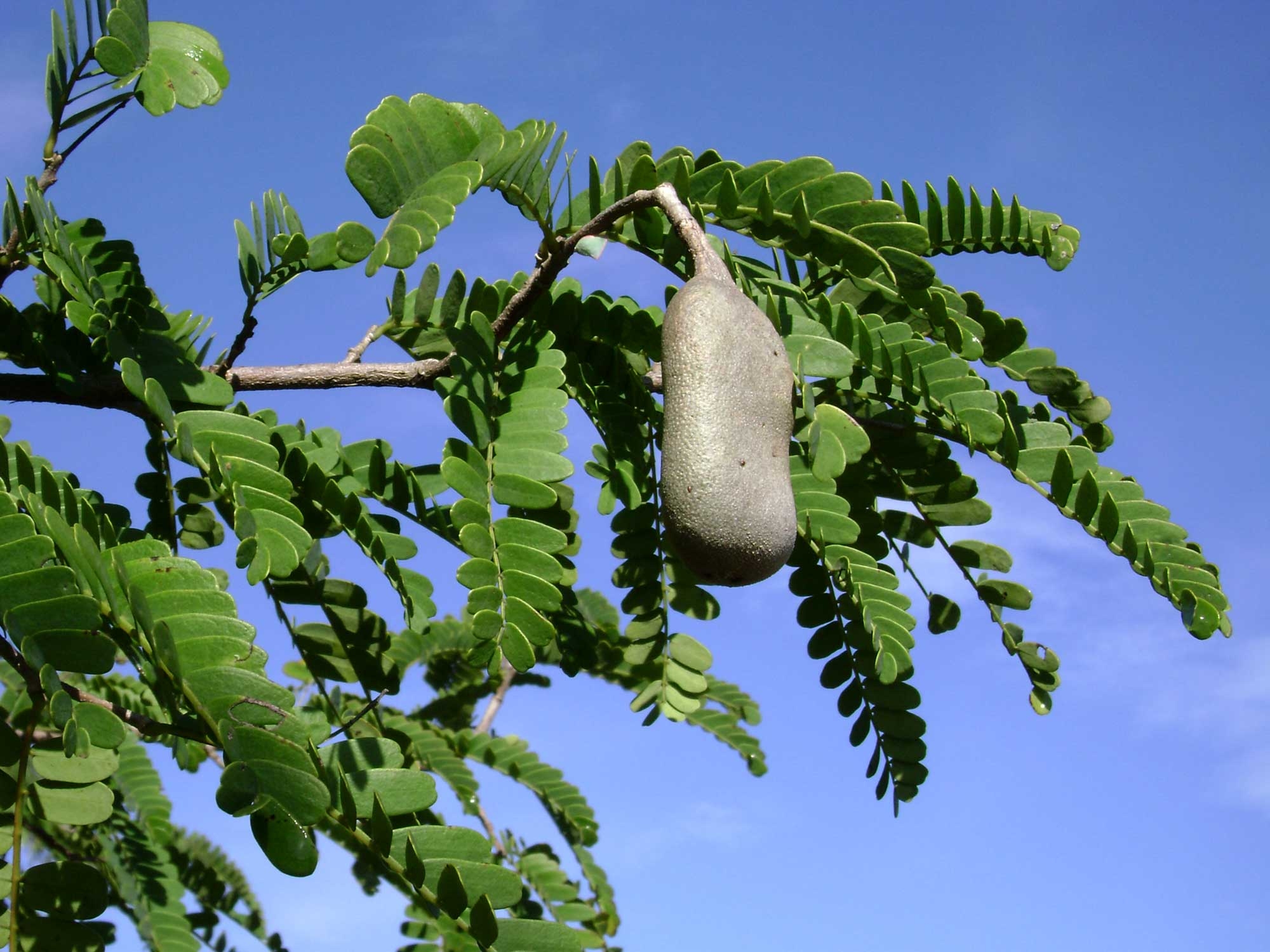
Leaves and fruit pod

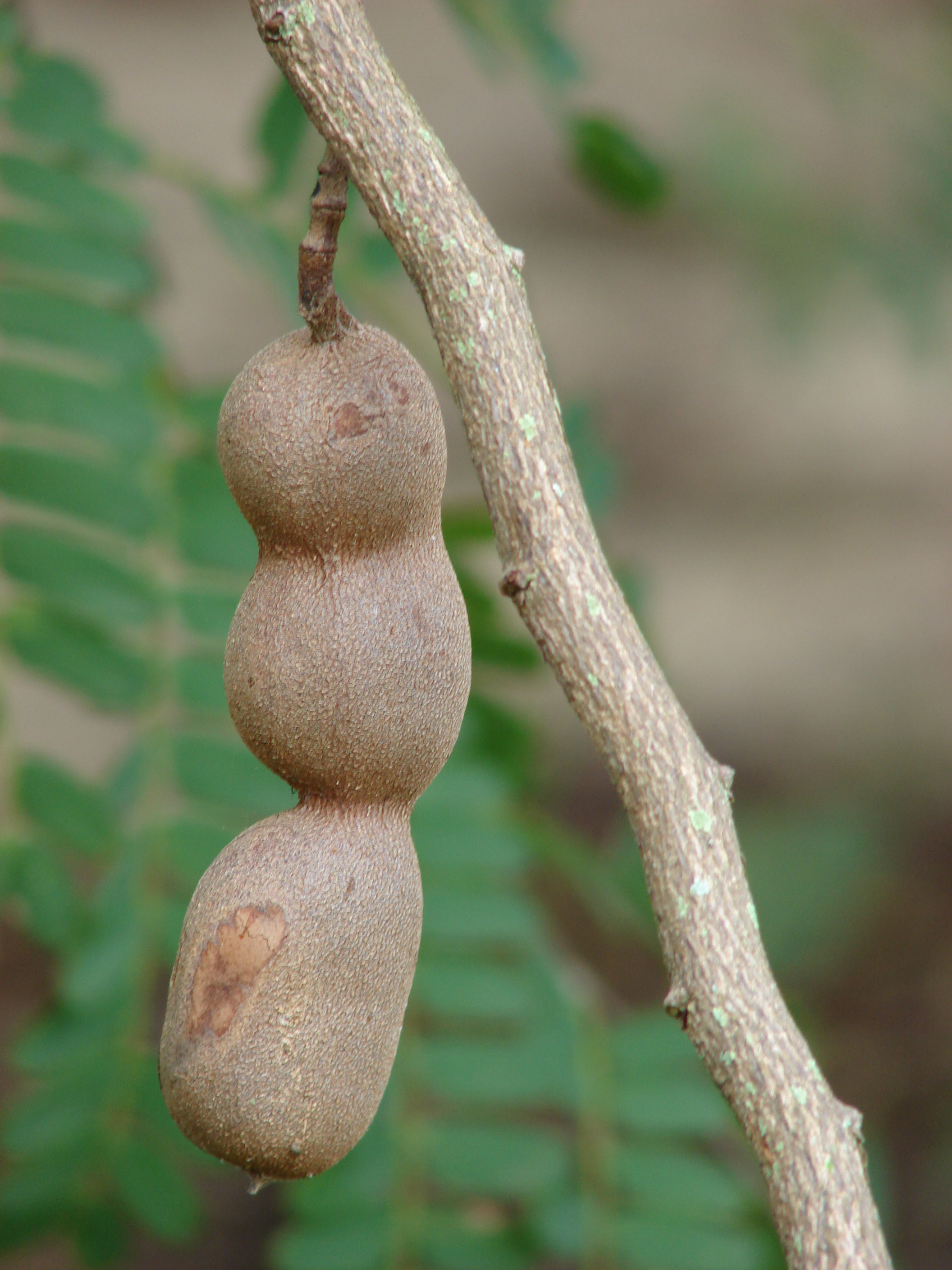
Single fruit pod

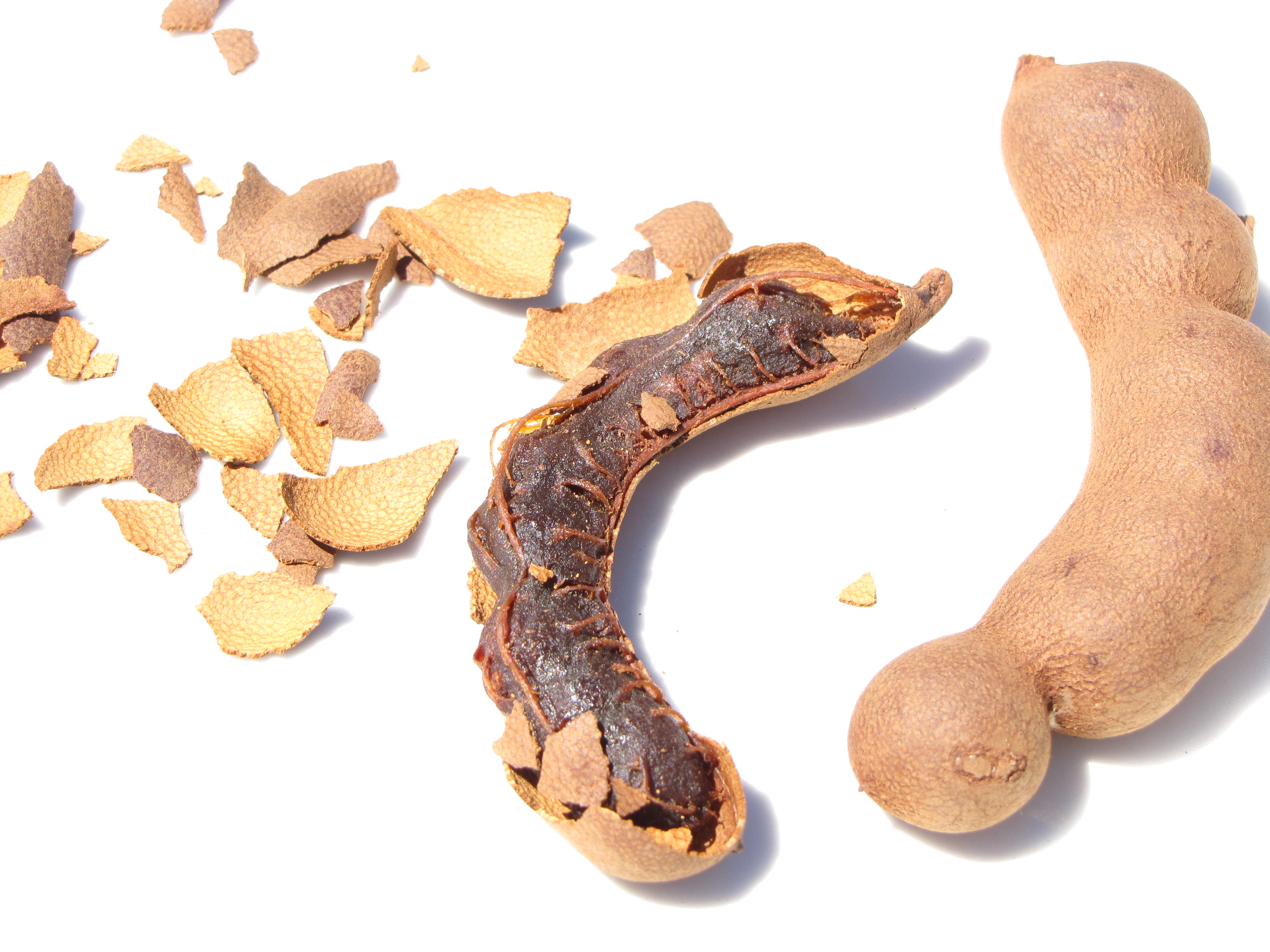
Pulp inside a broken pod
