= Pulparindo =

Mexican candy

The Pulparindo logo

Pulparindo mascot

Pulparindo is the trade name of a Mexican candy produced by Dulces de la Rosa. The candy is made from the pulp of the tamarind fruit, and is flavored with sugar, salt, and chili peppers, making it simultaneously tart, sweet, salty, and spicy. The "extra picante" variation is especially spicy.

== Flavors ==
There are original (tamarind), mango, watermelon, and apricot flavors.

== Lead content ==
In July 2007, the California Department of Public Health announced they had conducted testing on Pulparindo Extra Hot candy showing it contained between 0.12 and 0.18 ppm of lead. According to the U.S. Food and Drug Administration (FDA), this level of lead in the "Extra Hot" version was above acceptable limits for candy that is not frequently eaten by small children. However, as of December 19, 2007, after further tests confirming lead levels below 0.10 ppm, this advice was rescinded allowing Pulparindo Extra Hot with a best before date of JUN 09 or later to be sold once more in California.
