= Jallab =

Middle Eastern fruit syrup

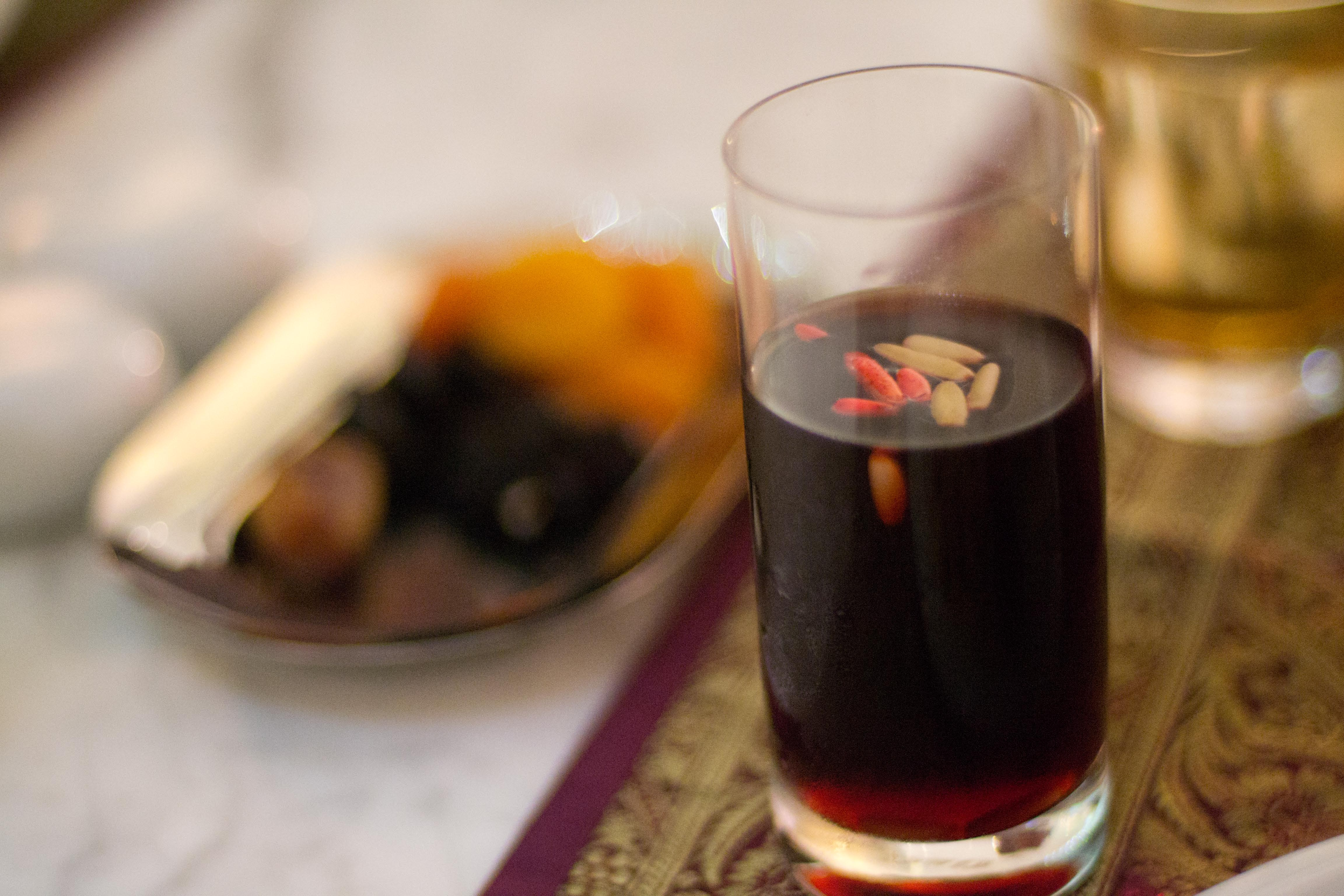
- A glass of jallab
- Type: Fruit syrup
- Place of origin: Lebanon, Palestine, Syria
- Region or state: Levant
- Main ingredients: Carob, dates, grape molasses, and rose water

Jallab or jellab (Arabic: جلّاب, romanized: jallāb) is a type of fruit syrup popular in the Levant made from carob, dates, grape molasses, and rose water.

Sometimes grenadine syrup is used in preparing it and might be smoked with Arabic incense. It is usually sold with crushed ice and garnished with pine nuts and raisins.

Jallab is especially popular during Ramadan.

== See also ==
- Erk al sous
- Kharoub
- Levantine cuisine
- Qamar al-deen
- Tamr hindi
