= Sucanat =

Whole cane sugar brand introduced by Pronatec

Sucanat

Sucanat (a contraction of "Sucre de canne naturel") is a brand name for a variety of whole cane sugar that was introduced by Pronatec in 1978. Like panela and muscovado, Sucanat retains its molasses content. It is essentially pure dried sugar cane juice. The juice is extracted by mechanical processes, heated, and cooled, forming small brown grainy crystals.

Similar products that are created using minimal processing are panela from Latin America, rapadura from Brazil, muscovado from the Philippines, and jaggery, which can be found in Asia, Africa, Latin America, and the Caribbean. Sucanat and these other products contain much of the molasses that would otherwise be removed in the refining process, giving them a strong flavor.

Sucanat is now a registered trademark of Ragus Holdings, Inc.
