= Sweet cicely =

Sweet cicely is a common name for several plants and may refer to:

- Cicely, a cultivated European herb (Myrrhis odorata)
- Osmorhiza, a genus of plants native to North America
