= Boiled cider =

Fruit syrup made from apple cider

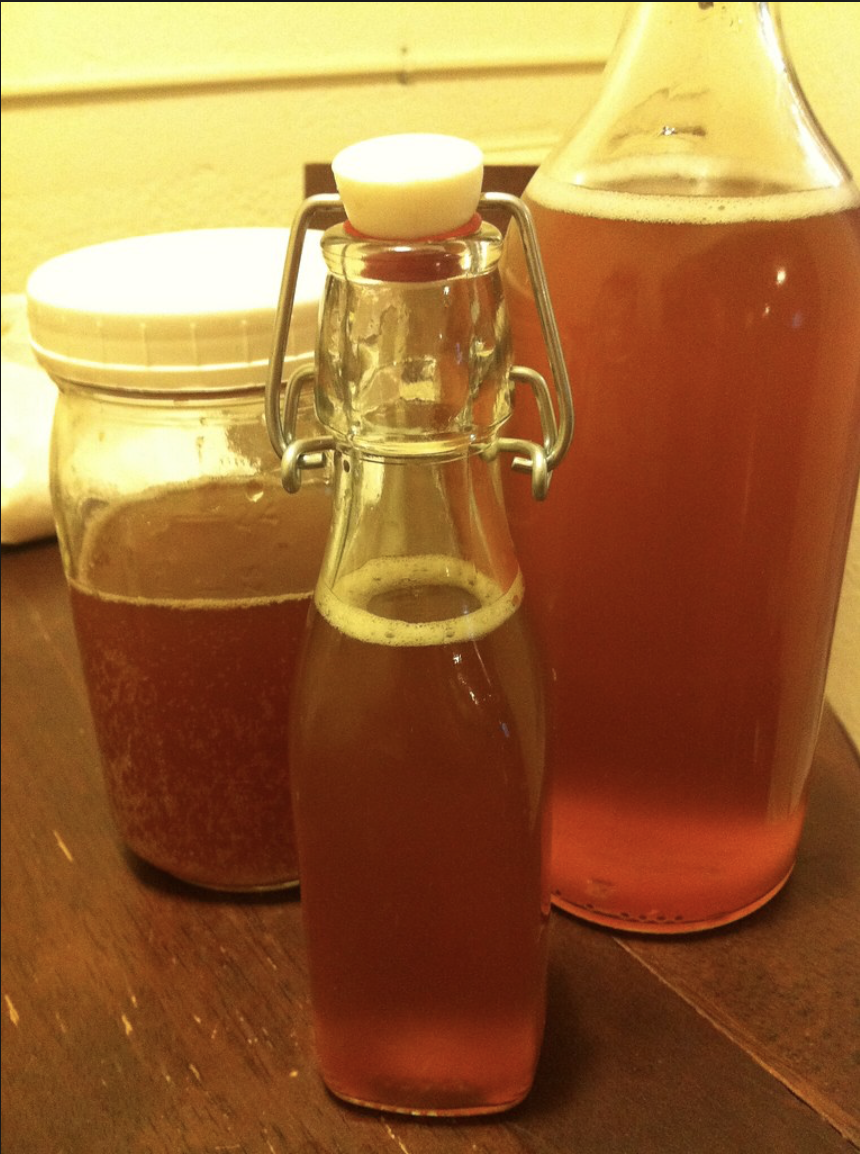
- Bottled cider syrup (unlabeled)
- Alternative names: Cider syrup, apple molasses
- Place of origin: United States
- Main ingredients: Apple cider

Boiled cider, also known as cider syrup or apple molasses, is a fruit syrup concentrate made from apple cider. First produced in colonial America,, it is still produced today in Maine, Massachusetts, and other parts of New England. It is considered an endangered regional food tradition of the United States.

Boiled cider is produced by boiling apple cider until the water content of the cider has evaporated. It is a thick, dark brown, opaque syrup with a concentrated apple flavor. As a sweetening agent, it was historically used as a substitute for imported cane sugar and molasses. It is now used as an ingredient in baking and cooking in place of maple syrup or other syrups where an apple flavor is desired.

== History ==
Production of boiled cider originated in colonial North America, particularly in New England, where apples were abundant and households developed methods to preserve the harvest beyond the autumn season. Boiled cider was an alternative to maple sugar for backcountry farmers, most of whom did not reside near the central coastal or river routes.

During the 18th and 19th centuries, boiled cider was mostly produced in rural communities for use as a household sweetener in cooking and baking. The syrup was used in desserts, sauces, and preserves, and in some cases was diluted with water when fresh cider was no longer available.

The production and domestic use of boiled cider declined during the 20th century as refined sugars became cheaper, refrigeration reduced reliance on concentrated fruit products, and traditional cider mills became less common. By the mid-20th century, cider syrup had largely disappeared from everyday household use and survived primarily as a regional food tradition in parts of New England.

== Characteristics ==
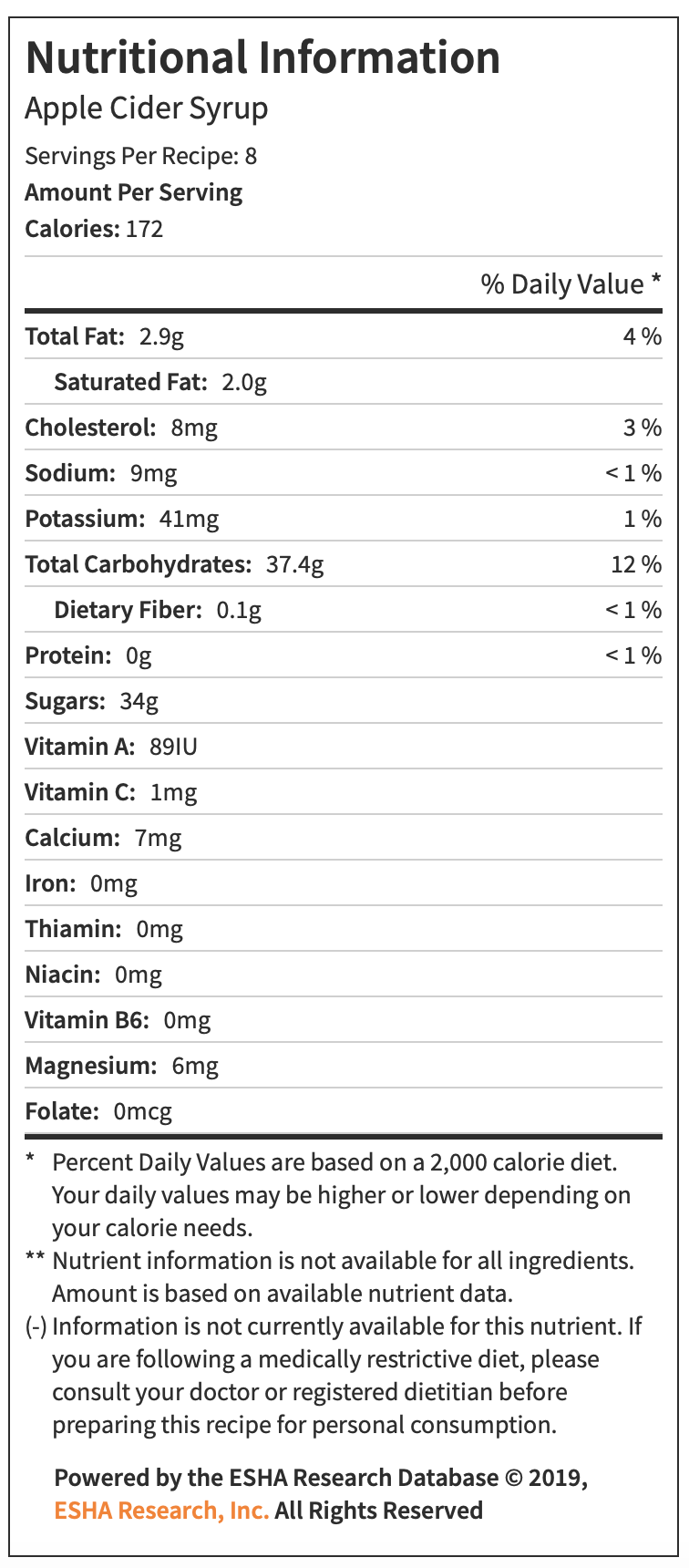
Cider syrup full nutrition list

Boiled cider is a thick, dark brown syrup with a sharp aroma of apples.

== Production ==
=== Apples ===
Boiled cider has typically been produced from "sweeting" apples, which contain less malic acid than other apples.

=== Historical production ===
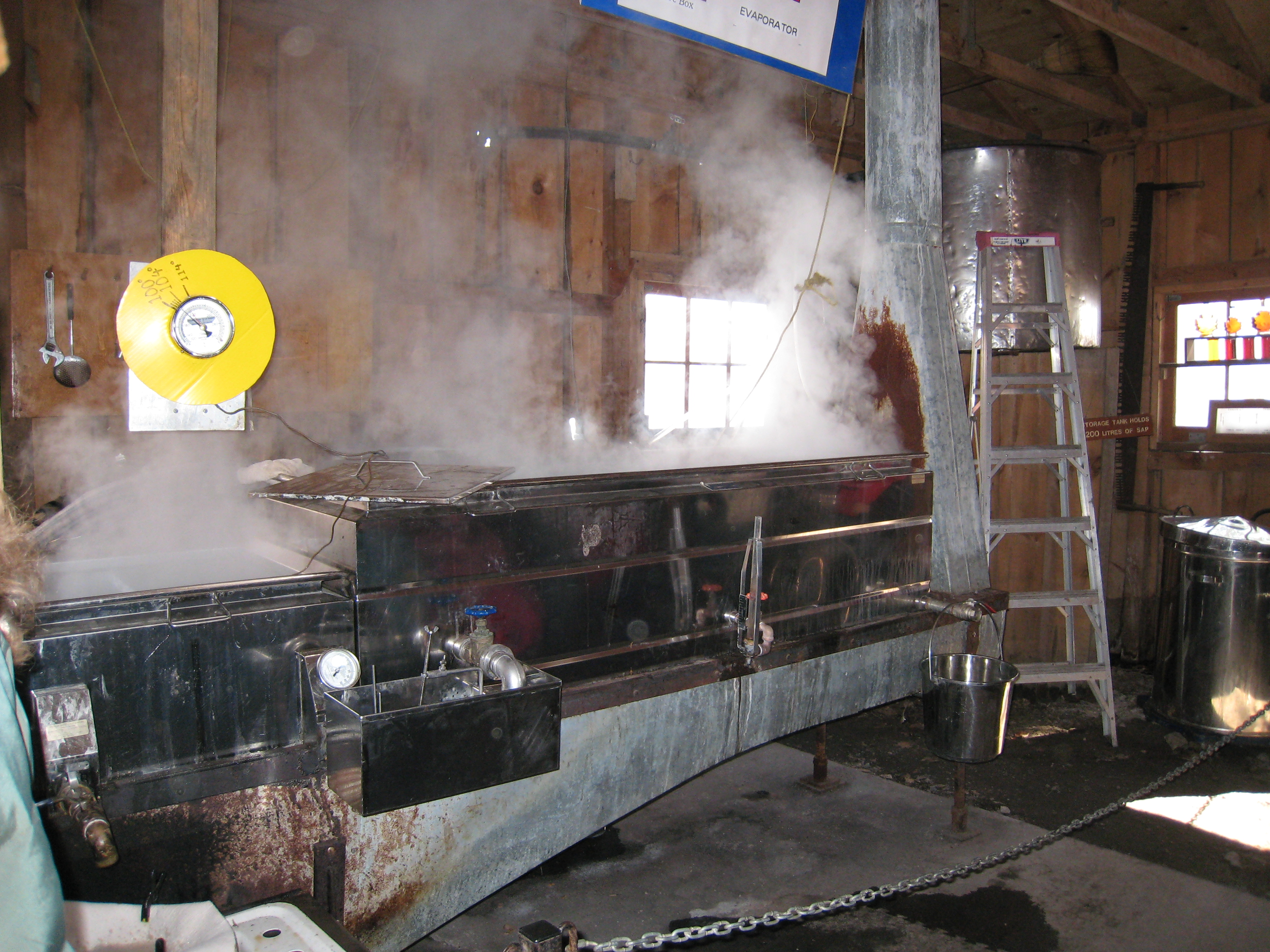
Boiling syrup

Boiled cider and other cider syrups were produced by putting fresh juice into an open, non-reactive metal container and skimming the surface as it boiled down, until its volume was reduced. approximately one-seventh of the original. This process was labor-intensive and expensive. At least one early source states that premium apple molasses can be produced by steam cooking apples in a container, weighing them down in slatted baskets and pressing their juice through the straw, and then reducing the expressed juice. Most manufacturers only ground, squeezed and boiled down the apples into fresh juice, fermented them into alcohol, or made cider syrup.

Gail Borden Jr., of New York City (who also developed condensed milk) gained a patent for the "Improvement in Concentrating and Preserving for Use Cider and Other Juices of Fruits" (Patent No. 35,919, dated 22 July 1862), which introduced the use of a vacuum pan as part of the preservation process.

Another early production method called for the treatment of cider with milk of lime to neutralize the malic acid and heating the cider to its boiling point. The boiled cider is then passed through a filter press, evaporated, and then re-filtered to create a final syrup product.

=== Modern production ===
Contemporary manufacturing practices boil off the apple cider in evaporator pans similar to those used in the production of maple syrup.

== See also ==
- List of apple dishes
