= Tamr hindi =

Beverage made from tamarind consumed in Egypt and the Levant

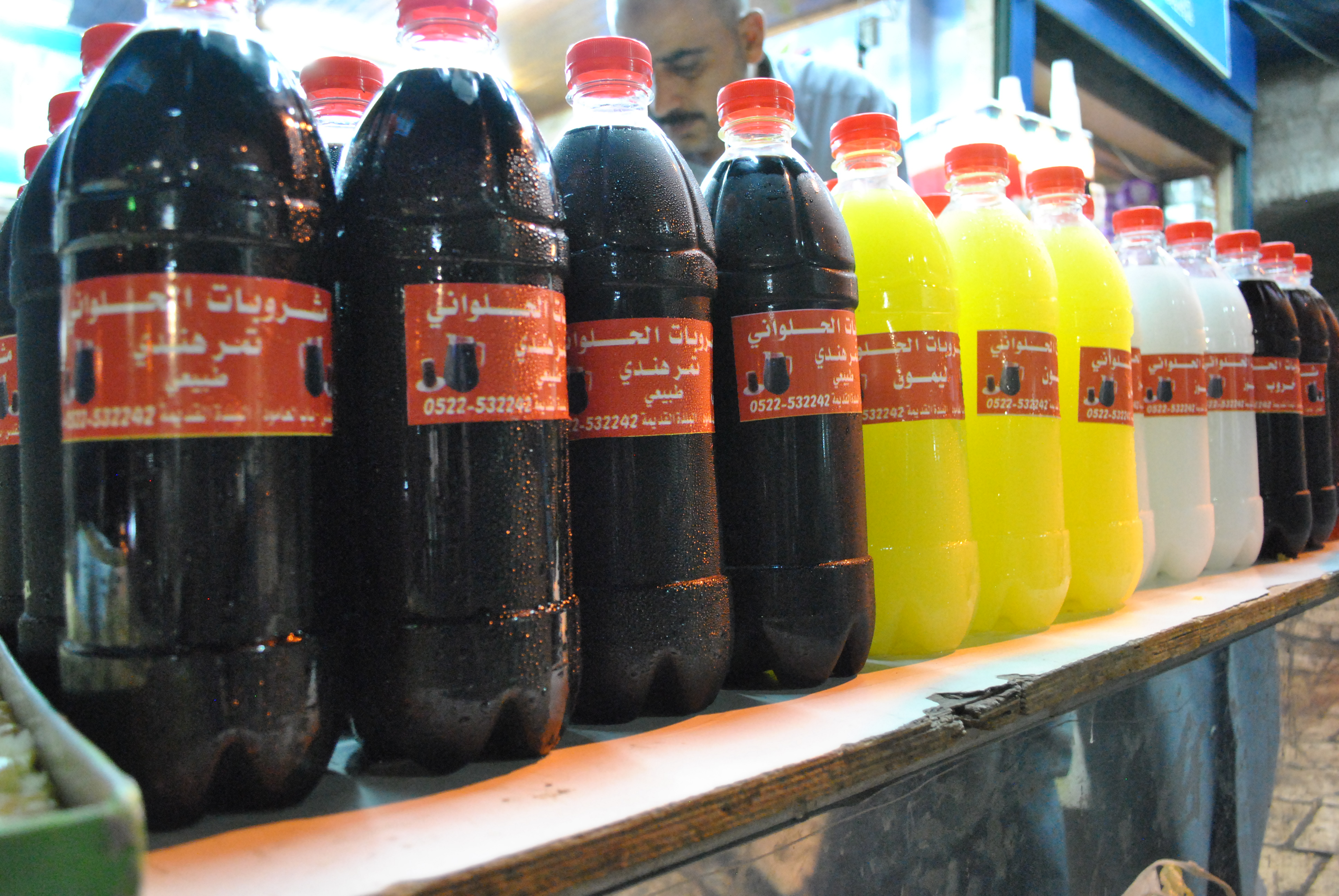
- Bottles of Tamr Hindi on the left
- Origin: Egypt and the Levant, Middle East and North Africa
- Colour: Brown
- Ingredients: Tamarind, water, sugar

Tamr hindi (Arabic: تمر هندي, romanized: tamr hindī, lit. 'tamarind') is a beverage consumed in Egypt and the Levant made from tamarind, water, and sugar. It has a sweet and tangy flavor and is especially popular during Ramadan, providing a refreshing drink after fasting.

== Preparation ==
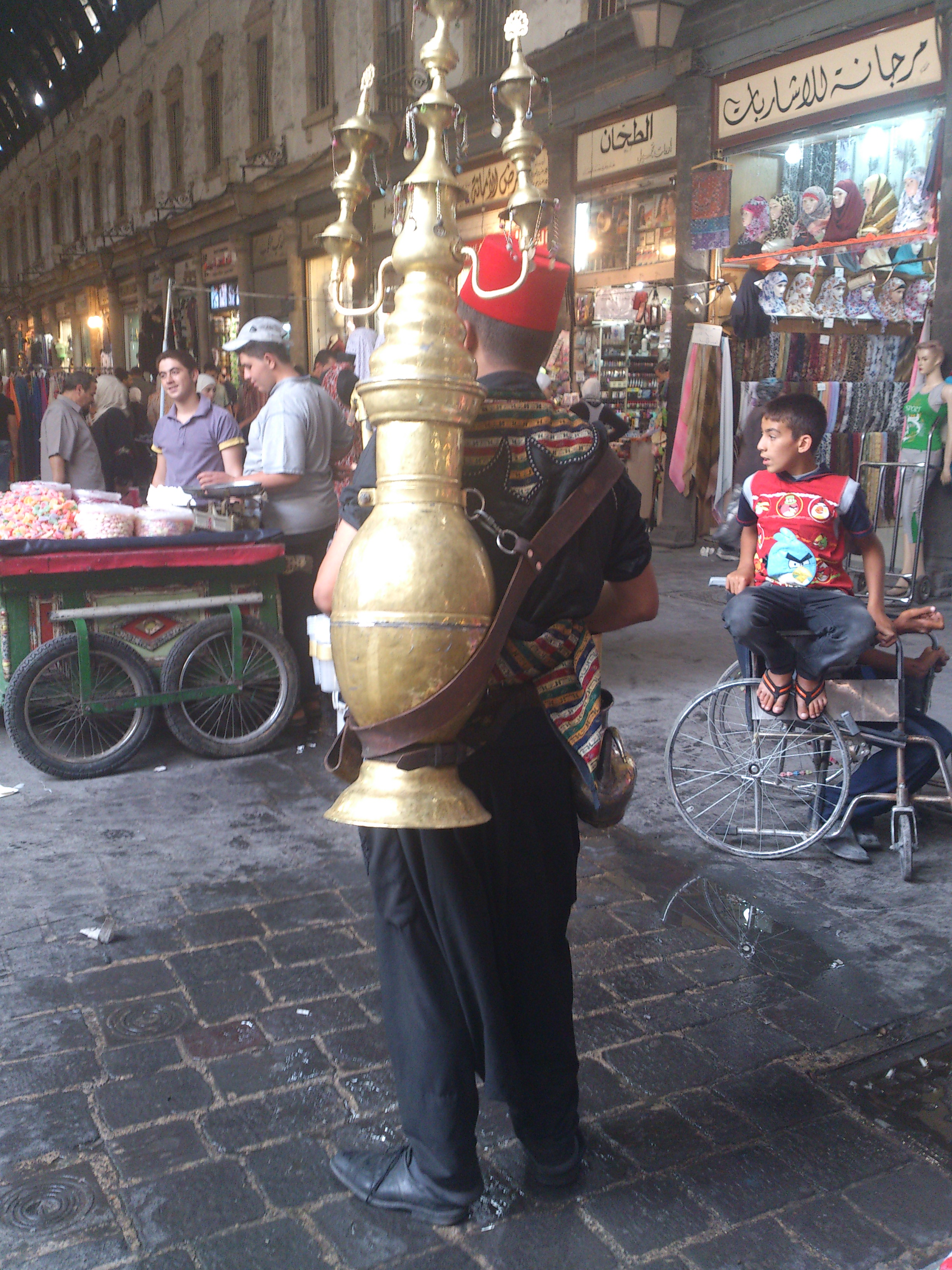
A tamr hindi salesman on the streets of Damascus

The Egyptian version of tamr hindi is prepared by soaking tamarind in water until it softens, allowing it to release its juice. The softened tamarind is then strained, and the process may be repeated multiple times to extract as much flavor as possible. After straining, sugar is added and stirred until dissolved. The drink is then chilled and served over ice, sometimes with a touch of blossom water for aroma.

In an alternative method, tamarind is boiled in water until it softens, then strained, with additional water and sugar added to enhance the flavor. Some variations include the addition of rose water for a fragrant note. To serve, the concentrated tamarind syrup is diluted with cold water and adjusted for sweetness before being poured over ice.

Rose water can be added to flavor the drink.

== Popularity ==
Tamr hindi’s balance of sweetness and tartness makes it a staple in Egyptian households, particularly during warm weather and festive occasions like Ramadan.

Like many other Ramadan foods, the Syrian civil war caused the popularity of tamr hindi to drop in Syria due to the war's economic effects, some sellers had to omit sugar from the drink as they could not afford it.

The beverage is traditionally served from an ornate brass jug.

== See also ==
- Tamarind juice
- Tamarindo (drink)
