= Saba (condiment) =

Condiment used in Italy

Saba (or sapa)
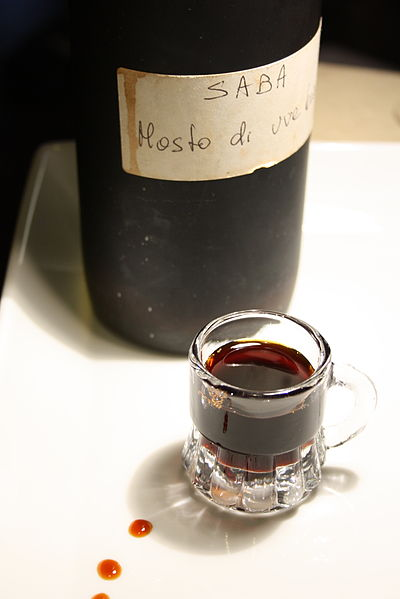
- Region or state: Emilia-Romagna

Saba, or sapa, is a typical condiment used in Emilia, Romagna, Marche, Umbria, Abruzzo, Apulia and Sardinia.

It is a concentrated syrup of grapes which is obtained from the fresh must of white or red grapes; variants include "mosto cotto", "vino cotto" or "miele d'uva". The must is poured in a copper pot together with some whole walnuts which, by turning during the slow boiling, help the must not to stick to the bottom of the pot. The saba is ready when it is reduced to one third of its initial quantity.

It is very sweet and keeps well due to the sugar content.

== Etymology ==
The terms "saba" and "sapa" are derived from the Latin word sàpor.

== Kitchen use ==
La sapa, ch'altro non è se non un sciroppo d'uva, può servire in cucina a diversi usi poiché ha un gusto speciale che si addice in alcuni piatti. È poi sempre gradita ai bambini che nell'inverno, con essa e colla neve di fresco caduta, possono improvvisar dei sorbetti.

— Pellegrino Artusi, La scienza in cucina e l'arte di mangiar bene, 1895

It was used, together with honey and other fruit juices reduced by cooking when cane or beet sugar was unknown or very expensive. It was used both for homemade sweets and to give more flavor to poor dishes such as polenta or to dip piadina or gnocco fritto.

It is also used as a dressing for salads and as a sauce for cream and ice creams. In summertime, it is added to water and drank.

It used to soak sabadoni, ravioli made with apples and quince pears. It is also used to keep soft the typical Christmas bread of Modena.

Marche

In Staffolo, Apiro and Cingoli, in the province of Macerata, sapa is used to create one of the most characteristic sweets of the winter period: cavallucci, croissants filled with sapa and dried fruit which can be kept for a long time. In Rosora, in the province of Ancona, in the second half of October, there is a festival dedicated to sapa.

Umbria

Sapa, here also called mosto cotto, is used for the creation of typical products. For example, in Terni it is an important ingredient of panpepato (a Christmas sweet), while in Assisi it is used as condiment for many dishes, such as roasts.

Sardinia

Saba, obtained from must, or from the fruits of prickly pear (Saba de figu morisca), or more rarely from strawberry tree, is frequently used in the preparation of typical sweets. In Barbagia, Logudoro and Anglona saba (or sapa) is obtained from must, in Oristano instead saba of prickly pear is mostly used.

Apulia

Saba, called "vincotto", can also be obtained from figs which, gathered withered directly from the tree and mixed to ripe ones, are blanched until the liquid is amber. The whole is put in large cloths with a medium texture and pressed in order to obtain the liquid which is further thickened over a slow fire. Saba is also widely used in traditional Apulian confectionery, both for dipping cartellate and calzoncelli, and as an ingredient for mixing sasanelli and mostacciuoli.

== Turkish pekmez ==
Similar but obtained in a different way due to the type of fruit used is Turkish pekmez, in use since the times of Ottoman Empire. This juice (of grape, fig or other) boiled is used as a sweet syrup, combined to tahina for breakfast or as an ingredient for many recipes in pastry making.

== See also ==
- Vincotto

== Bibliography ==
- Pellegrino Artusi (1974). La scienza in cucina e l'arte di mangiar bene. Piero Camporesi (introduzione e note). Torino: Einaudi. ISBN 9788828101666. OCLC 898641064.
