= Cooked wine =

Cooked wine may refer to:

- Mulled wine, which is red wine with spices, served hot
- Vin cuit from Provence, France
- Vin cuit from Switzerland, concentrated apple sauce
- Vino cotto from Central Italy
- Vincotto from Northern Italy
