= Tahini roll =

Sweet bun with tahini

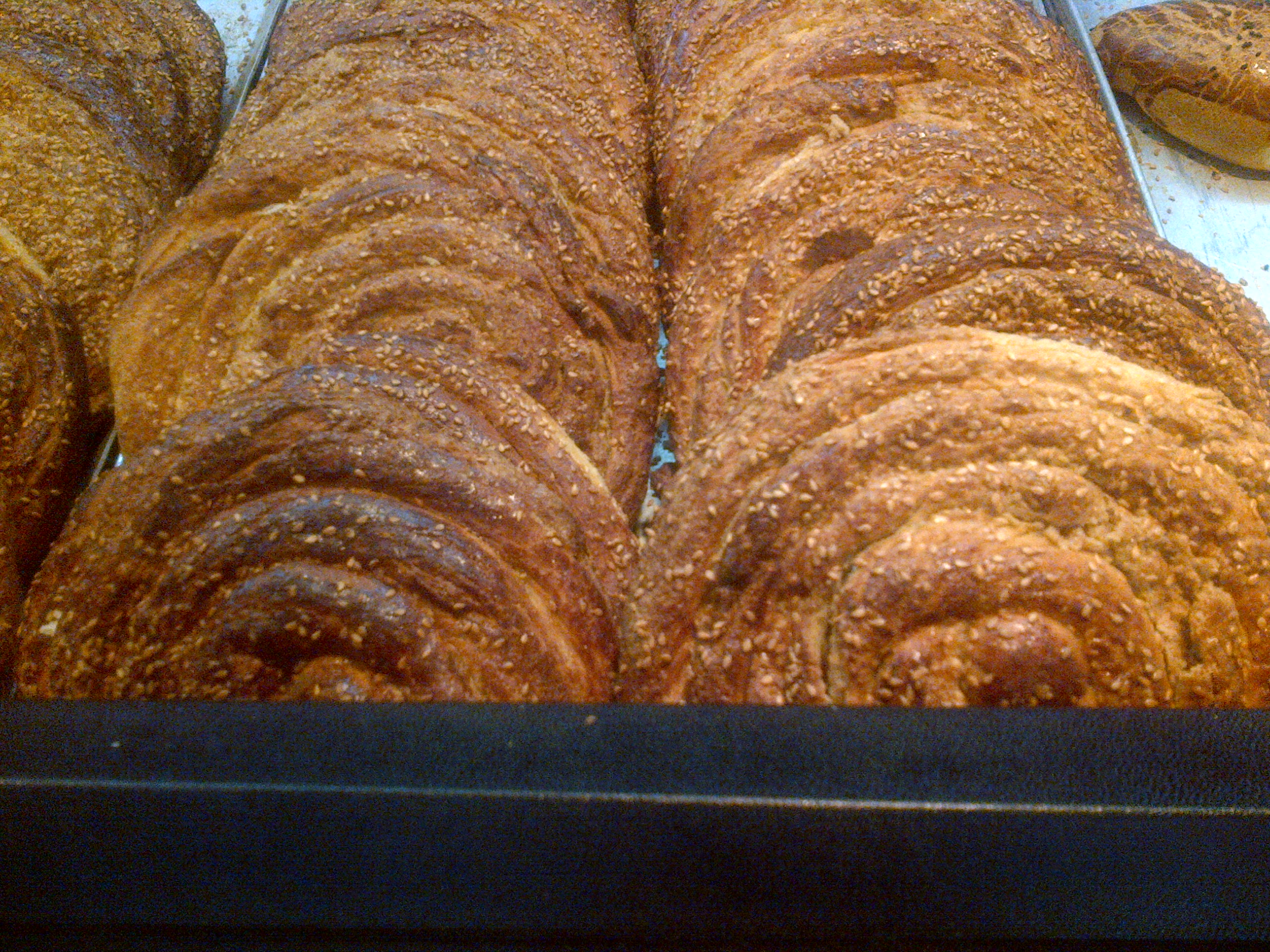
- Alternative names: Tahinov hats, Tahinopita, Khubz tahini, Tahinli çörek
- Type: Sweet roll
- Region or state: Armenia, Cyprus, Greece, Turkey, Levant
- Main ingredients: Dough, tahini, sugar, cinnamon

A tahini roll or tahini bread roll is a Sweet roll found commonly in the cuisines of the Levant, Armenia, Cyprus, Greece and Turkey.

== Geographic scope ==
=== Armenia and the Levant ===
Tahini rolls are popular in Armenian cuisine, where they are called tahinov hatz (Armenian: Թահինով հաց). The rolls are made with a soft dough consisting of flour, water, yeast, sugar and butter, while the filling consists of tahini mixed with sugar and cinnamon.

Armenians migrating to the Levant popularized the dessert there.

=== Cyprus and Greece ===
Tahinopita is a type of tahini roll that is popular as a street food in Cyprus and in some areas of Greece, the tahini roll is sometimes likened to cinnamon rolls. In the Cypriot capital of Nicosia, street vendors with carts or bikes, as well as bakeries sell tahini rolls. They are popular during Lent.

=== Turkey ===
In Turkey, they are most popular during the month of Ramadan, during which they are consumed on suhur.

== Preparation ==
The dough includes sugar and oil and has a texture between a bread and a cookie. It is leavened with yeast and can be baked after the first rise. Sometimes the pastry may be soaked in syrup of sugar or honey and flavored with cinnamon.

Tahini rolls are made by rolling the dough flat, spreading it with the tahini mixture, sprinkling with sugar and rolling into a log shape. The dough is then sliced into smaller pieces and flattened to form a circle.

== Name and etymology ==
The Armenian name is tahinov hats (Թահինով Հաց), translated meaning Tahini bread. In the Greek language it is known as ταχινόπιττα (tahinopita) or τασιηνόπιττα (tasinopita); in Cypriot Greek the pronunciation is "tashinopita" with a "sh" sound as opposed to "h" in mainland Greek. In Arab countries it is known as khubz tahini (Arabic: خبز الطحينة).

In the Turkish language, the general term is tahinli çörek, although in Cypriot Turkish it is known simply as tahınlı or tahınnı. The name ekmek tahinli is sometimes used as well. The word çörek in Turkish refers to a variety of buns and breads, often sweet.

== See also ==
- List of bread rolls
- Sweet roll
- Fig roll
