= Grape syrup =

Condiment made from grape juice

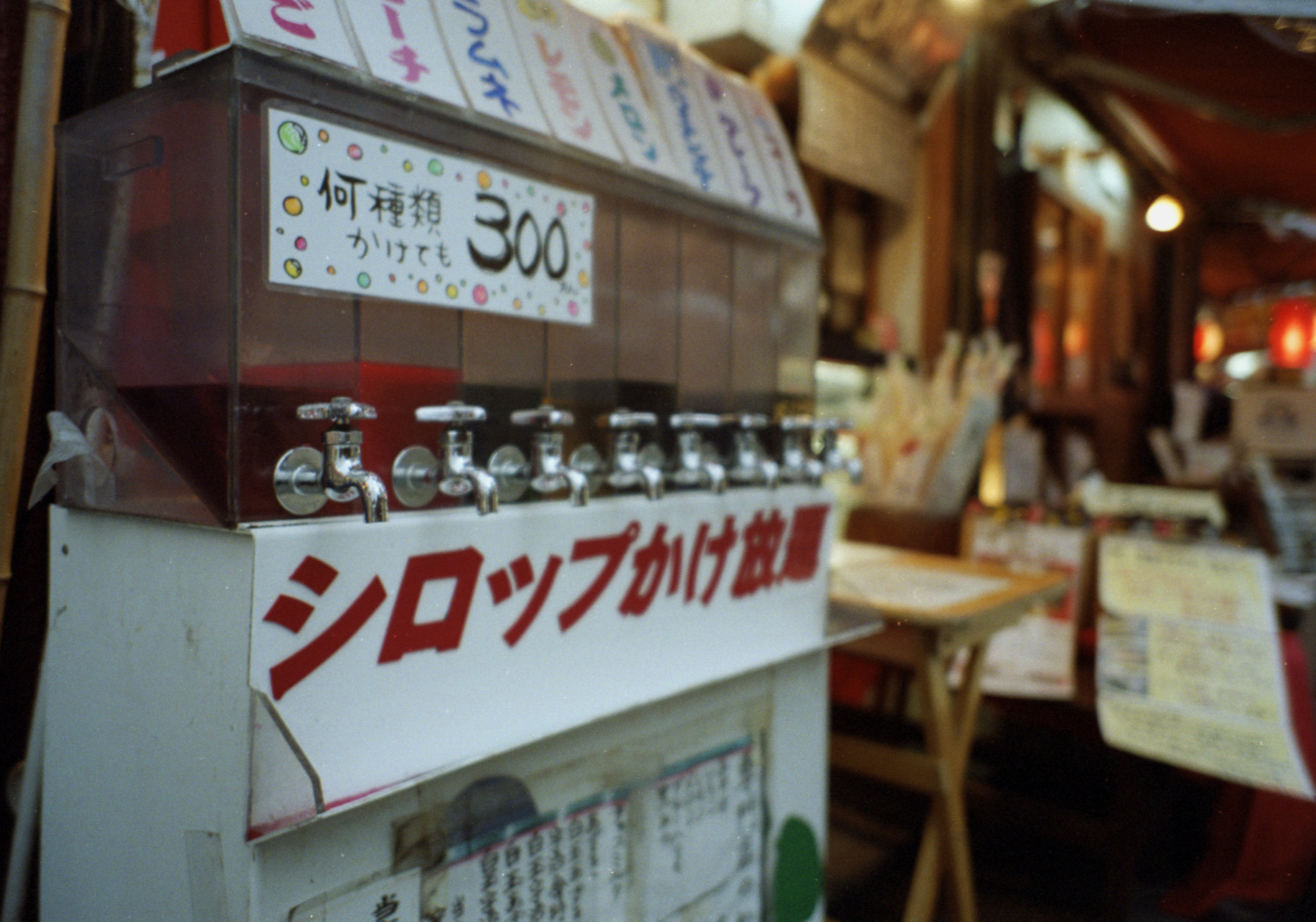
Eight-flavor syrup dispenser including grape syrup in Shibamata in Tokyo, Japan

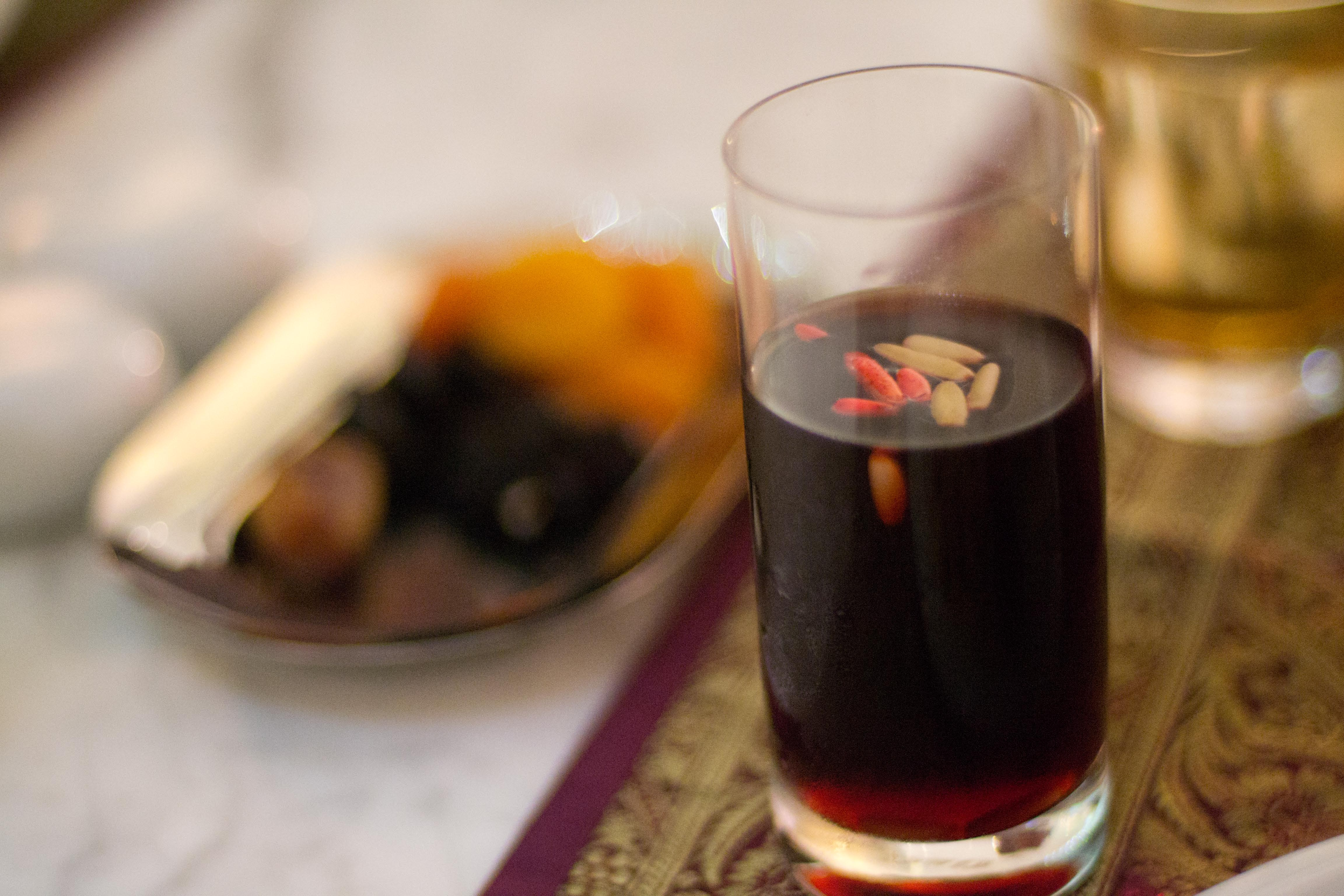
Jallab syrup made from carob, dates, grape molasses and rose water; used to make jallab tea

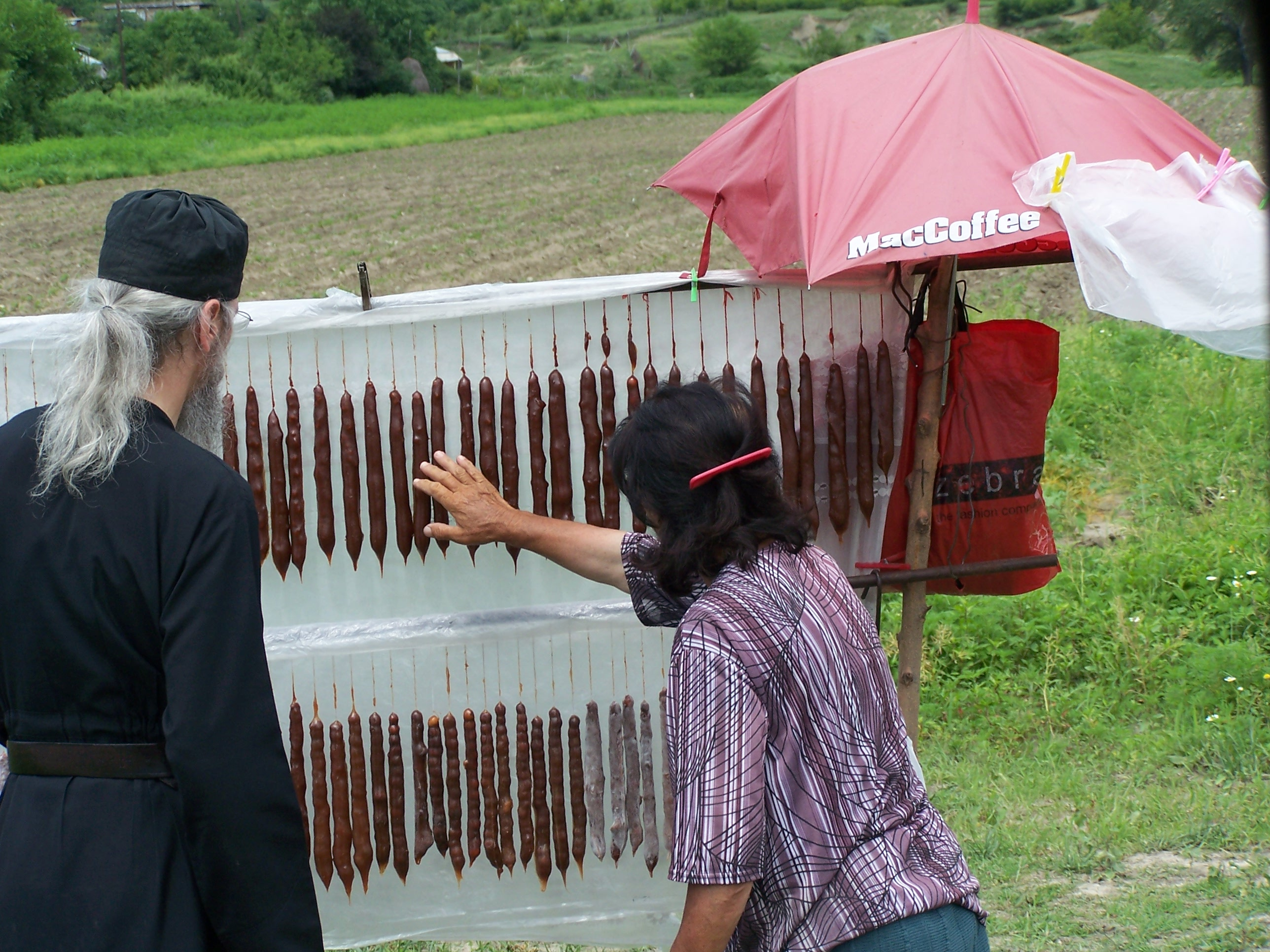
Churchkhela, a snack made from nuts (walnuts or hazelnuts, usually) dipped in grape syrup

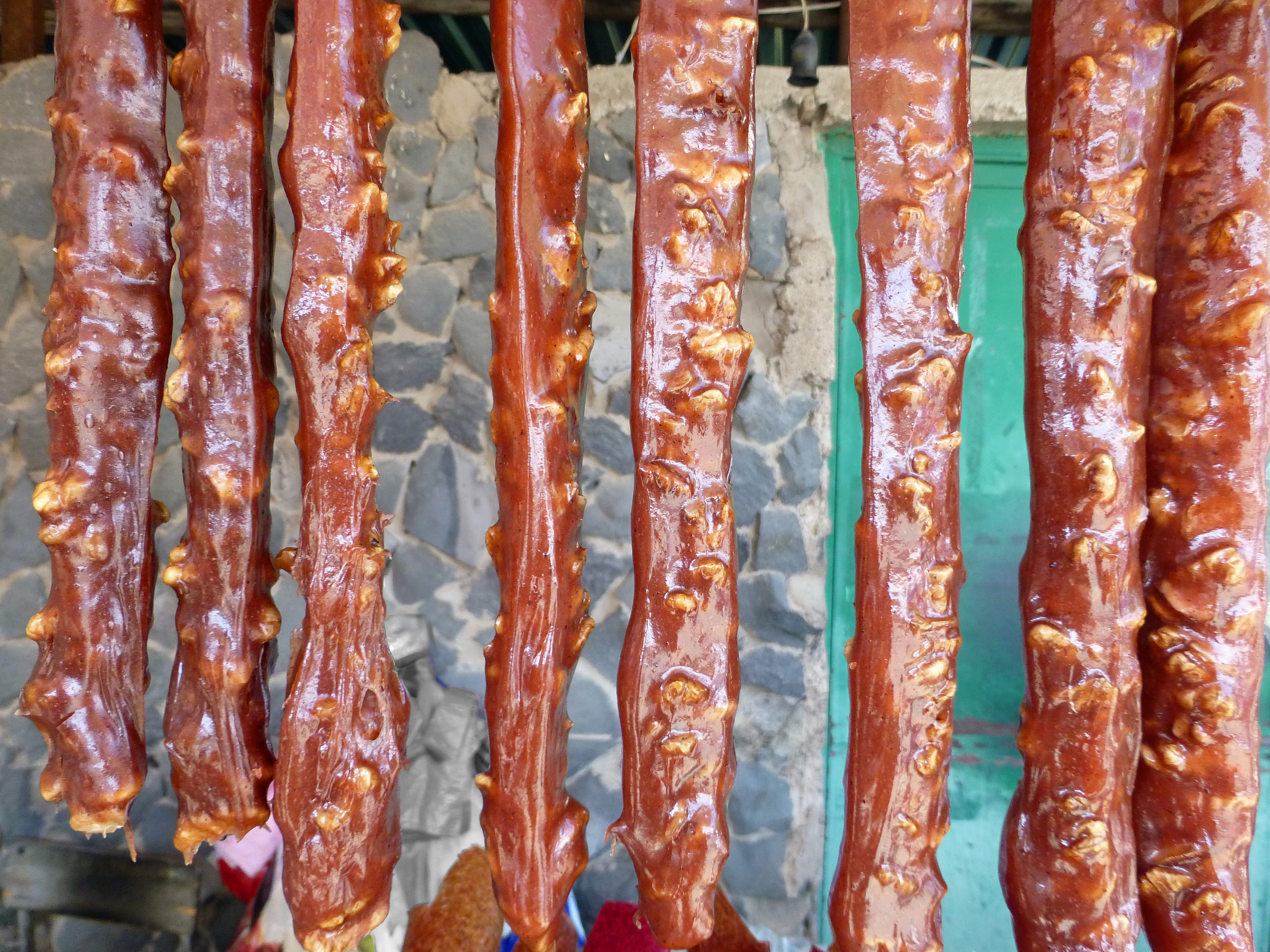
Sharots, an Armenian confection made by dipping nuts (mostly walnuts) on a string inside grape, or other fruit syrups

Grape syrup is a condiment made with concentrated grape juice. It is thick and sweet because of its high ratio of sugar to water. Grape syrup is made by boiling grapes, removing their skins, and squeezing them through a sieve to extract the juice. Like other fruit syrups, a common use of grape syrup is as a topping to sweet cakes, such as pancakes or waffles.

It is found in multiple Balkan, Middle Eastern and Caucasian cuisines, under a variety of names.

== Names and etymology ==
The ancient Greek name for grape syrup is siraios (σιραίος), in the general category of hepsema (ἕψημα), which translates to 'boiled'. The Greek name was used in Crete and, in modern times, in Cyprus.

In modern times, petimezi is the common name for Greek grape syrup. The word comes from the Persian petmez (پتمز), which usually refers to grape syrup, but is also used to refer to mulberry syrup, which is especially popular in Armenia, and other fruit syrups. In Turkey, it is known as pekmez, a word recorded in the 1073 dictionary Dīwān Lughāt al-Turk by Mahmud al-Kashgari. In Armenia, Iran, Azerbaijan and more West Asian countries, this grape syrup is known as doshab, and in Palestine, it is (Arabic: دبس) dibs or dibes. Iranians also call it shir-e angoor.

Vincotto (not to be confused with vino cotto) is the southern Italian term for grape syrup. It is made only from cooked wine grape must (mosto cotto), with no fermentation involved. There is no alcohol or vinegar content, and no additives, preservatives or sweeteners are added. It is both a condiment and ingredient used in either sweet or savory dishes.

== History ==
=== Greco-Roman ===
One of the earliest mentions of grape syrup comes from the fifth-century BC Greek physician Hippocrates, who refers to hépsēma (ἕψημα), the Greek name for the condiment. The fifth-century BC Athenian playwright Aristophanes also makes a reference to it, as does Roman-era Greek physician Galen.

Grape syrup was known by different names in Ancient Roman cuisine depending on the boiling procedure. Defrutum, carenum, and sapa were reductions of must. They were made by boiling down grape juice or must in large kettles until it had been reduced to two-thirds of the original volume, carenum; half the original volume, defrutum; or one-third, sapa. The Greek name for this variant of grape syrup was siraion (σίραιον).

The main culinary use of defrutum was to help preserve and sweeten wine, but it was also added to fruit and meat dishes as a sweetening and souring agent and even given to food animals such as ducks and suckling pigs to improve the taste of their flesh. Defrutum was mixed with garum to make the popular condiment oenogarum. Quince and melon were preserved in defrutum and honey through the winter, and some Roman women used defrutum or sapa as a cosmetic. Defrutum was often used as a food preservative in provisions for Roman troops.

There is some confusion as to the amount of reduction for sapa and defrutum. As James Grout explains in its Encyclopedia Romana, authors informed different reductions, as follows:

The elder Cato, Columella, and Pliny all describe how unfermented grape juice (mustum, must) was boiled to concentrate its natural sugars. "A product of art, not of nature," the must was reduced to one half (defrutum) or even one third its volume (sapa) (Pliny, XIV.80), although the terms are not always consistent. Columella identifies defrutum as "must of the sweetest possible flavour" that has been boiled down to a third of its volume (XXI.1). Isidore of Seville, writing in the seventh century AD, says that it is sapa that has been reduced by a third but goes on to imagine that defrutum is so called because it has been cheated or defrauded (defrudare) (Etymologies, XX.3.15). Varro reverses Pliny's proportions altogether (quoted in Nonius Marcellus, De Conpendiosa Doctrina, XVIII.551M).

Defrutum is mentioned in almost all Roman books dealing with cooking or household management. Pliny the Elder recommended that defrutum only be boiled at the time of the new moon, while Cato the Censor suggested that only the sweetest possible defrutum should be used.

In ancient Rome, grape syrup was often boiled in lead pots, which sweetened the syrup through the leaching of the sweet-tasting chemical compound lead acetate into the syrup. Incidentally, this is thought to have caused lead poisoning for Romans consuming the syrup. A 2009 History Channel documentary produced a batch of historically accurate defrutum in lead-lined vessels and tested the liquid, finding a lead level of 29,000 parts per billion (ppb), which is 2,900 times higher than contemporary American drinking water limit of 10 ppb. These levels are easily high enough to cause either acute lead toxicity if consumed in large amounts or chronic lead poisoning when consumed in smaller quantities over a longer period of time (as defrutum was typically used).

However, the use of leaden cookware, though popular, was not the general standard of use. Copper cookware was used far more generally and no indication exists as to how often sapa was added or in what quantity. There is not, however, scholarly agreement on the circumstances and quantity of lead in these ancient Roman condiments. For instance, the original research was done by Jerome Nriagu, but was criticized by John Scarborough, a pharmacologist and classicist, who characterized Nriagu's research as "so full of false evidence, miscitations, typographical errors, and a blatant flippancy regarding primary sources that the reader cannot trust the basic arguments."

=== Levant ===
Grape syrup has been used in the Levant since antiquity, as evidenced by a document from Nessana in the northern Negev, within modern Israel, that mentions grape syrup production. Sources describing the Muslim conquest of the Levant in 636 note that when Jews met with Rashidun caliph Umar, who camped in Jabiyah, southern Golan, they claimed that due to the harsh climate and plagues, they had to drink wine. Umar suggested honey instead, but they said it was not beneficial for them. As a compromise, Umar agreed they could make a dish from grape syrup without intoxicating effects. They boiled grape juice until two-thirds evaporated and presented it to Umar, who noted it reminded him of an ointment for camels. Botanist Zohar Amar estimates that this explains the winepresses from Mishnaic and Talmudic times found in the Mount Hermon area, which are similar to those used for grape syrup production in modern times.

Islamic law increased the prevalence of grape syrup in the region due to the prohibition of wine, a practice that was strictly enforced during the Mamluk period, when grape syrup became a common wine substitute among Muslims. Rabbi Joseph Tov Elem, who lived in Jerusalem around 1370, proposed that the honey mentioned in the Bible is actually grape syrup. Obadiah of Bertinoro also mentioned grape syrup among various types of honey sold in Jerusalem, and Meshullam of Volterra described it as "hard as a rock and very fine." Baalbek, in modern Lebanon, was particularly renowned for its dibs production, and Ibn Battuta detailed the production process, noting the use of a type of soil to harden the syrup so that it remained intact even if the container broke. In the 15th century, hashish users mixed it with dibs to mitigate its effects. Rabbis such as Nissim of Gerona and Obadish of Bertinoro discussed its kashrut. In the early Ottoman period, there was sometimes a special tax on raisins and dibs. In the 19th century, Hebron exported significant quantities of grape syrup to Egypt, as documented by Samson Bloch and Samuel David Luzzatto.

=== Islamic civilization ===
In early Islam, hépsēma was known in Arabic as tilā’. Early caliphs distributed tilā’ to Muslim troops along with other foodstuffs, considering that it was no longer intoxicating. However, fermentation could resume in the amphorae, and in the late 710s, Caliph ‘Umar II prohibited drinking this beverage.

== Modern ==
=== Greece ===
Petimezi
Nutritional value per 100 g (3.5 oz)
- Energy: 1,380 kJ (330 kcal)
- Carbohydrates: 80.9 g
- Fat: 0.4 g
- Protein: 0.9 g
Vitamins and minerals
Minerals	Quantity %DV^{†}
Calcium	6% 74 mg
Iron	7% 1.2 mg
Phosphorus	3% 40 mg
- Varkazas, p. 203
- ^{†}Percentages estimated using US recommendations for adults.

Petimezi (Greek: πετιμέζι Greek pronunciation: [petiˈmezi]), also called epsima (έψημα) and in English grapemust, or grape molasses, is a syrup that is reduced until it becomes dark and syrupy. Petimezi keeps indefinitely. Its flavor is sweet with slightly bitter undertones. The syrup may be light or dark colored, depending on the grapes used. Before the wide availability of inexpensive cane sugar, petimezi was a common sweetener in Greek cooking, along with carob syrup and honey. Petimezi is still used today in desserts and as a sweet topping for some foods. Though petimezi can be homemade, it is also sold commercially under different brand names.

Fruits and vegetables that have been candied by boiling in petimezi (epsima) are called retselia.

From late August until the beginning of December, many Greek bakeries make and sell dark crunchy and fragrant petimezi cookies, moustokoúloura (μουστοκούλουρα).

Petimezopita (πετιμεζόπιτα) is a spiced cake with petimezi.

=== Cyprus ===
The ancient Greek name hépsēma (now pronounced épsēma in Cypriot Greek) is still used to refer to the condiment, which is made in Cyprus.

=== Armenia ===
In Armenia, grape syrup, carob syrup, pomegranate syrup, mulberry syrup and apricot syrup are called doshab (Armenian: դոշաբ). Doshab is one or the main ingredients of a traditional Armenian confection called sharots, which is made by dipping a string of halfed walnuts inside a spiced version of doshab (mostly grape doshab, while pomegranate and apricot versions also exist). Doshab is also used in multiple foods, like stuffed apples, matzoon, chi kofta and more, while It can be used as a condiment for every dish, or as a topping for desserts such as gata and as a medicine, especially for iron deficiency anemia (carob version).

=== Iran ===
In Iranian cuisine, grape syrup (in Persian: شیره انگور) is used to sweeten ardeh (tahini), which is consumed at breakfast. An alternative is date syrup, which is also widely used in Middle Eastern cooking.

=== Italy ===
Saba, (from the Latin word sapa, with the same meaning), vincotto or vino cotto is commonly used in Italy, especially in the regions of Emilia Romagna, Marche, Calabria, and Sardinia, where it is considered a traditional flavor.

=== Kosovo ===
Pekmez is typically eaten alongside traditional dishes from the Albanian cuisine, like Flia. Popular variations include "Pekmez i dardhave" out of pears, "Pekmez i kumbullave“ out of plums, "Pekmez i kajsiave" out of mirabelles, "Pekmez i manave/dudave" out of mullberries and "Pekmez i kaçave" out of rose hips.

=== Turkey ===
In Turkey, grape syrup is known as pekmez, while carob, sugar beet, fig, juniper berry, or mulberry can also be used to make it. Pekmez made from carob is popularly recommended as a treatment for iron deficiency anemia. Pekmez is eaten on its own or mixed with sesame paste on cold winter days.

=== Azerbaijan ===
In Azerbaijan, pekmez is mixed with yogurt and consumed during summer time.

=== Levant ===
Grape syrup is known as dibs or dibs al-anab in the countries of the Levant (Palestine, Jordan, Lebanon, Israel and Syria). It is usually used as a sweetener and as part of desserts alongside carob syrup and bee honey. In Arab cuisine, dibs or dibis (in some regions called "robb" or "rubb") is made from pomegranates, grapes, carob, or dates.

The syrup is made in Druze villages in the northern Golan Heights.

In some areas, its combined with tahini to make a dip called dibs wa tahini (Arabic: دبس وطحينة), and then eaten with bread (typically pita), similar to pekmez, date syrup, or carob syrup.

Grape syrup is particularly popular in the city of Hebron, where the cultivation of grapes is also popular, where it is eaten in a variety of dishes, in combination with tahini to make a dip, or with snow to make rudimentary ice cream, similar ice cream is made in Syria.

=== North Macedonia ===
In North Macedonia, a form of grape syrup known as madjun (Macedonian: Гроздов маџун) has been produced for centuries, commonly used as a sweetener, but also as traditional medicine. It never contains any added sugar.

=== Balkans ===
In the Balkans, it is more jam-like in texture and usually made of plums. It usually contains more fruit products and less sugar than jam.

=== South Africa ===
In South Africa, the grape syrup is known as moskonfyt.

=== Spain ===
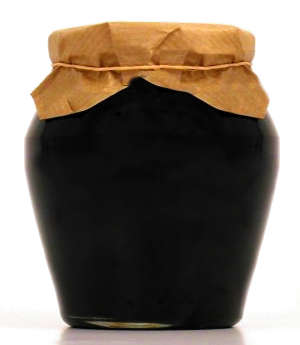
Honey arrope flask

Arrope is a form of grape concentrate typically produced in Spain. Often derived from grape varieties such as Pedro Ximénez, it is made by boiling unfermented grape juice until the volume is reduced by at least 50%, and its viscosity reduced to a syrup. The final product is a thick liquid with cooked caramel flavours, and its use is frequent as an additive for dark, sweet wines such as sweet styles of sherry, Malaga, and Marsala.

== See also ==
- Churchkhela, a sausage-shaped candy made from grape must, flour and nuts
- Drakshasava, an Ayurvedic tonic made from grapes
- Moustalevria
- Must
- Pomegranate syrup
- Sharots, Armenian confection of walnut halves coated in a spiced grape mixture
- Vino cotto
- List of fruit dishes
- List of grape dishes
- List of syrups
