= Panpepato =

Italian round, sweet cake

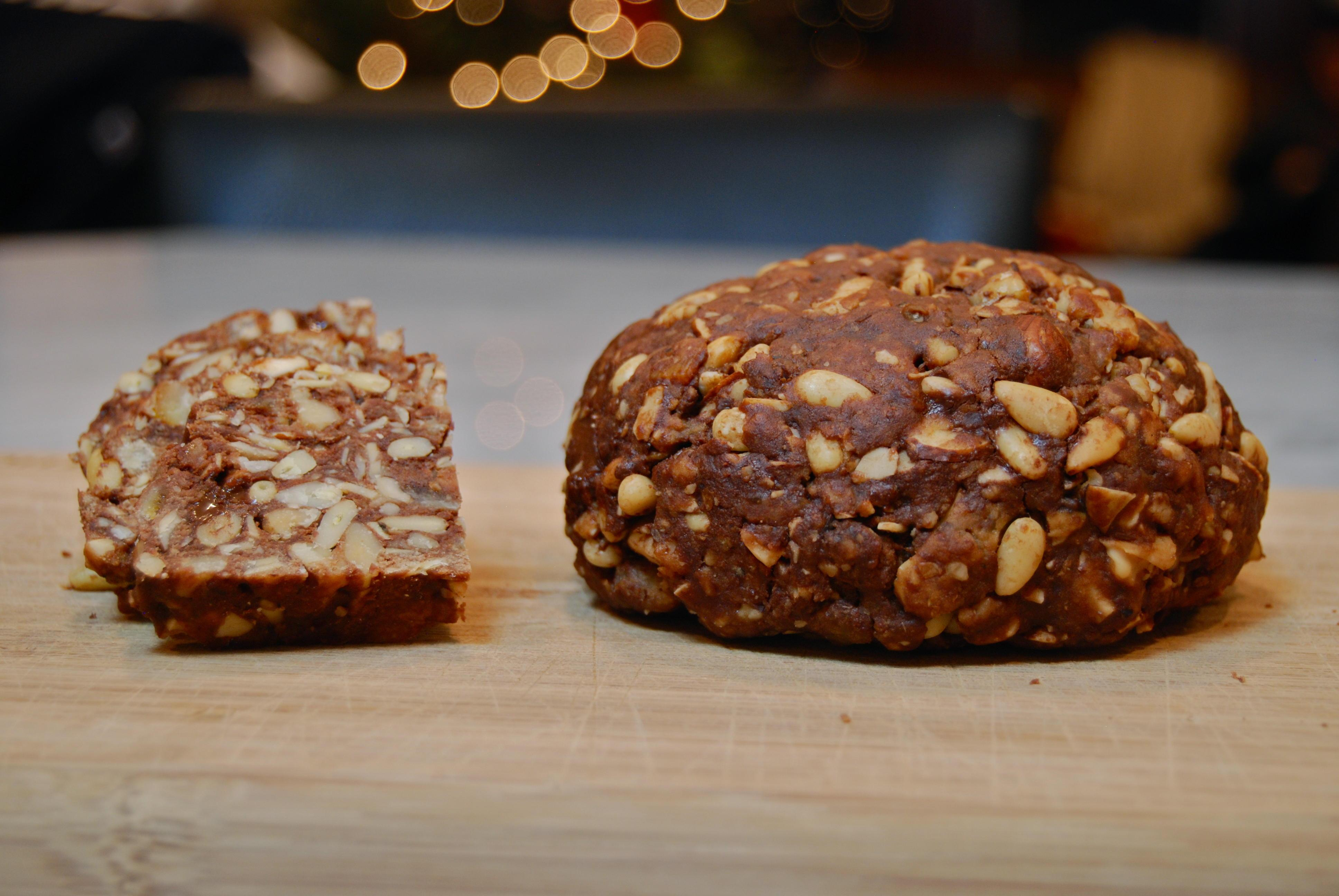
- Alternative names: Pampepato
- Type: Cake
- Place of origin: Italy
- Main ingredients: Almonds, hazelnuts, pine nuts, pepper, cinnamon, nutmeg, zest of orange and lime
- Variations: Pangiallo, panforte

Panpepato or pampepato (lit. 'peppered bread') is a round, sweet cake typical of the province of Ferrara, Siena, the south Umbria and north of Lazio. It is a type of panforte. Dating to the medieval era, it is often consumed on special occasions.

== History ==
Panpepato is "the direct descendant of medieval sweet breads" which during the Renaissance were traditionally prepared by bakers as a gift to their noble employers. Panpepato is attested as early as 1205 being made by Camaldolese nuns near Siena; the spices which lend panpepato its flavor likely traveled west after the Crusades. Ex-voto offerings of panpepato shaped like body parts that need healing are traditionally made for the Feast of San Rocco.

Borso d'Este served panpepati adorned with gold at a November 11, 1465 banquet. Anna Maria Luisa de' Medici requested panpepato from home after traveling to take up residence in Düsseldorf upon her marriage.

In Ferrara, panpepato di cioccolato remains a traditional food during the Christmas holidays. During World War II, Dwight D. Eisenhower received an 11-pound panpepato as a gift from the bakers of Ferrara.

== Preparation ==
Francesco Redi categorised the panpepato of his time in three versions: sopraffina, made with refined sugar and decorated with marzipan and icing; a medium quality version with honey; and a rustic version made from whole-wheat flour. In more modern times, Danilo Nannini re-introduced panpepato production to Siena in 1965 after conducting extensive research. During the production of Nannini panpepato, a mix of candied fruit, honey, sugar, and water is heated to 279 °C (534 °F); the heated syrup is combined with flour, nuts, and spices to make a dough; the dough is rolled in flour and moulded into discs for baking; and the finished product is cooled overnight before being sealed in aluminum foil and wrapped in paper packaging.

Recipes for panpepato vary greatly in different regions. In Tuscany, panpepato is typically made with almonds, hazelnuts, walnuts, pine nuts, and candied fruit rind; in Ferrara, panpepato is low and round, filled with fruits and nuts, and coated in chocolate; and in Umbria, panpepato often includes chocolate folded directly into the dough. (The addition of chocolate to panpepato post-dates the introduction of chocolate to Italy circa 1600.) Panpepato typically also includes spices, including cinnamon, nutmeg, coriander, and its namesake black pepper. Sweeteners such as honey or vincotto are often also used.

== See also ==
Media related to Panpepato at Wikimedia Commons

- List of Italian desserts and pastries
- Panforte
