= Panforte =

Dessert from Siena, Italy

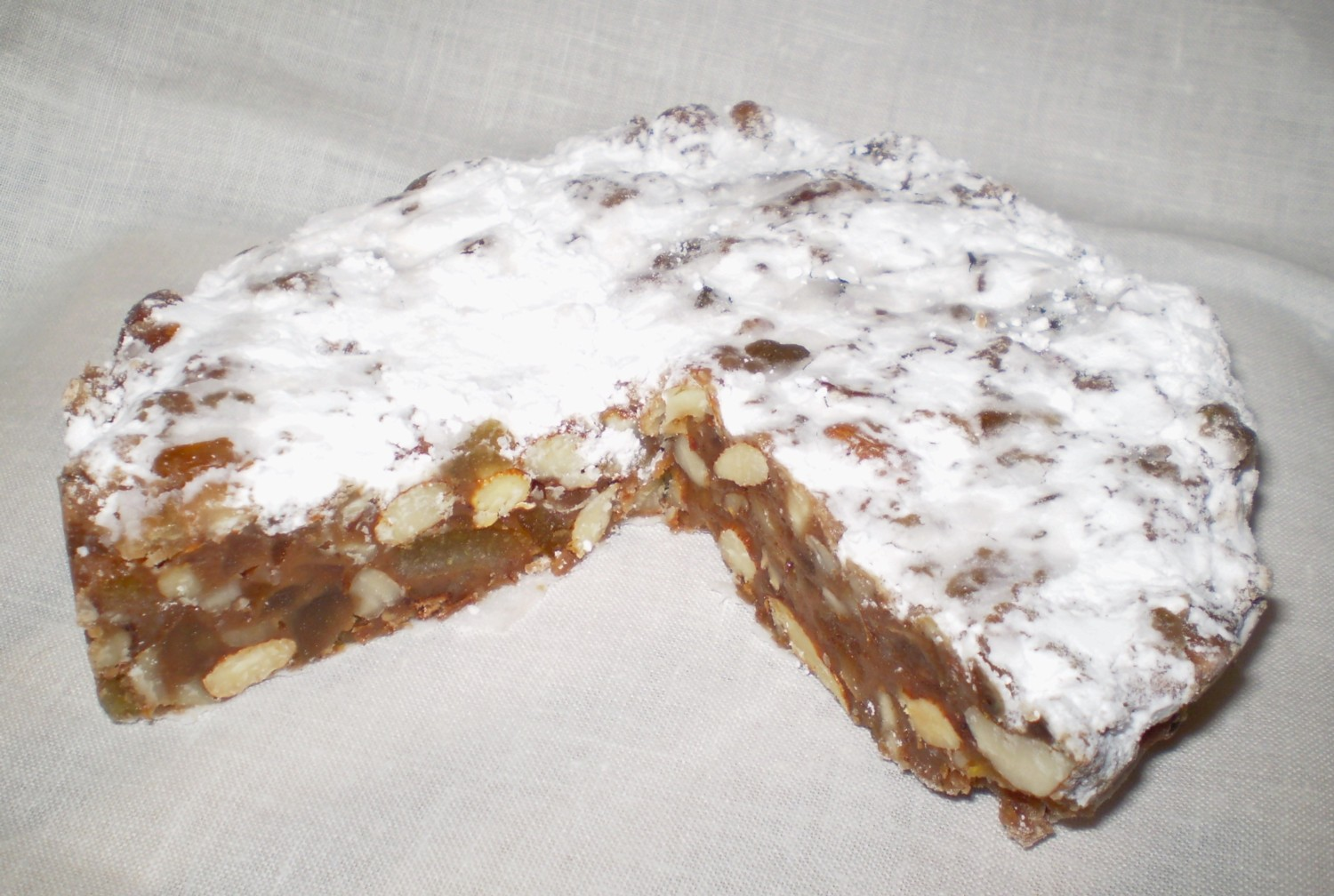
- Traditional style panforte
- Type: Confectionery
- Place of origin: Italy
- Region or state: Tuscany
- Main ingredients: Nuts, honey, sugar, fruits, spices
- Variations: Panpepato

Panforte is a chewy Italian dessert containing fruit and nuts. It is similar to a Florentine but is much thicker. Known throughout Italy, it is an Italian Christmas tradition associated especially with the province of Siena.

== History ==
Panforte dates back to at least the 13th century, in the Italian region of Tuscany. Documents from 1205, conserved in the State Archive of Siena, attest that bread flavored with pepper and honey (panes melati et pepati) was paid to the local monks and nuns of the monastery of Montecellesi (modern Monte Celso, near Fontebecci) as a tax or tithe which was due on 7 February that year.

Literally, panforte means 'strong bread', derived from the Latin fortis, which refers to the spicy flavour. Originally, the Sienese called it panpepato ('peppered bread'), due to the strong pepper used. The original dessert was composed of wheat flour, honey, spices, dried figs, jam and pine nuts and was flavored with pepper.

== Protected geographical indication ==
In 2013, panforte received the protected geographical indication (PGI) status.

== Gallery ==
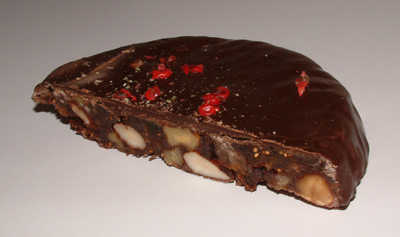
Panforte with chocolate

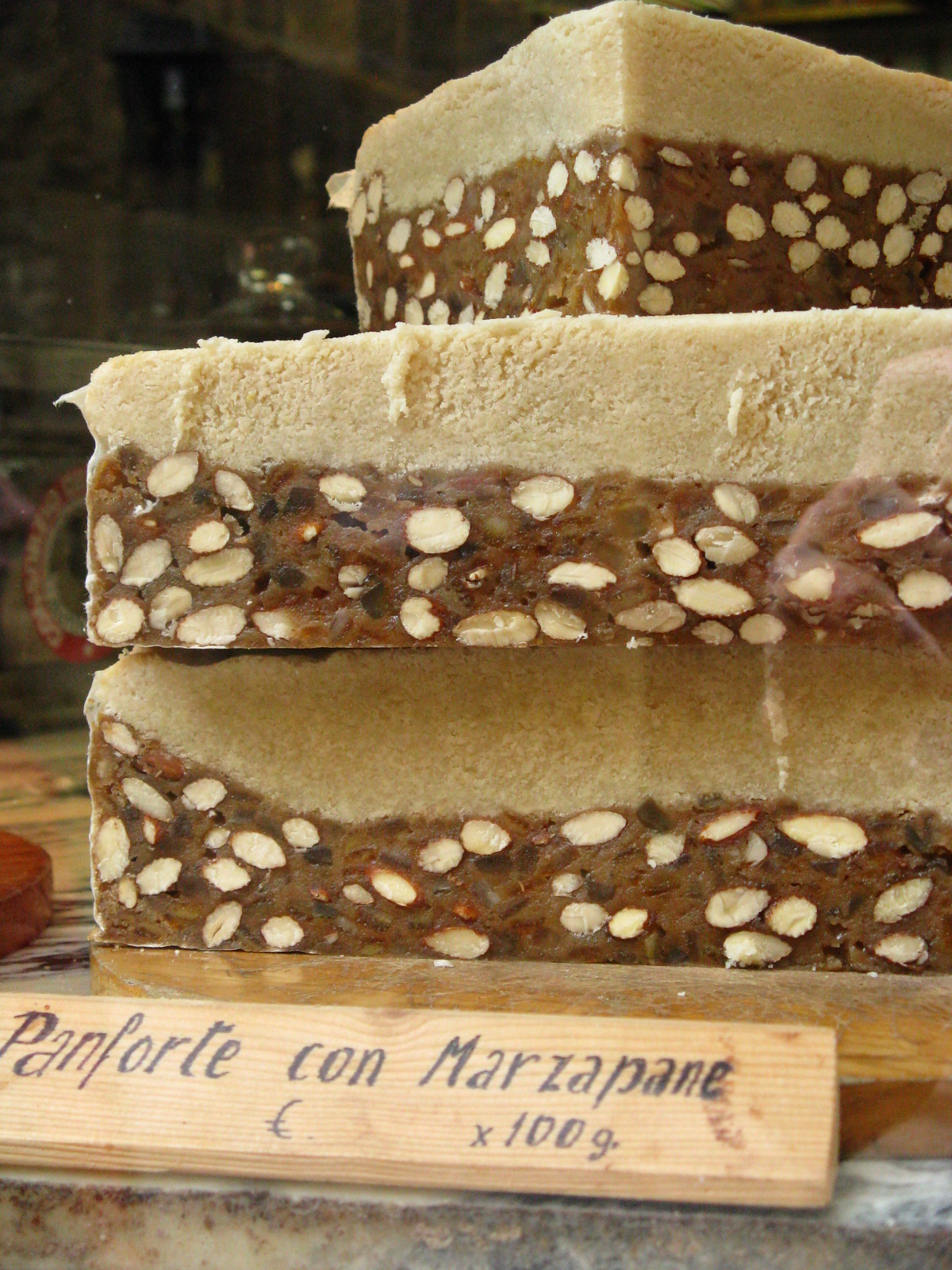
Panforte with marzipan at a shop in San Gimignano, Italy

== See also ==
- List of Italian desserts and pastries
- Panpepato
