= Tahini cookie =

Type of cookie

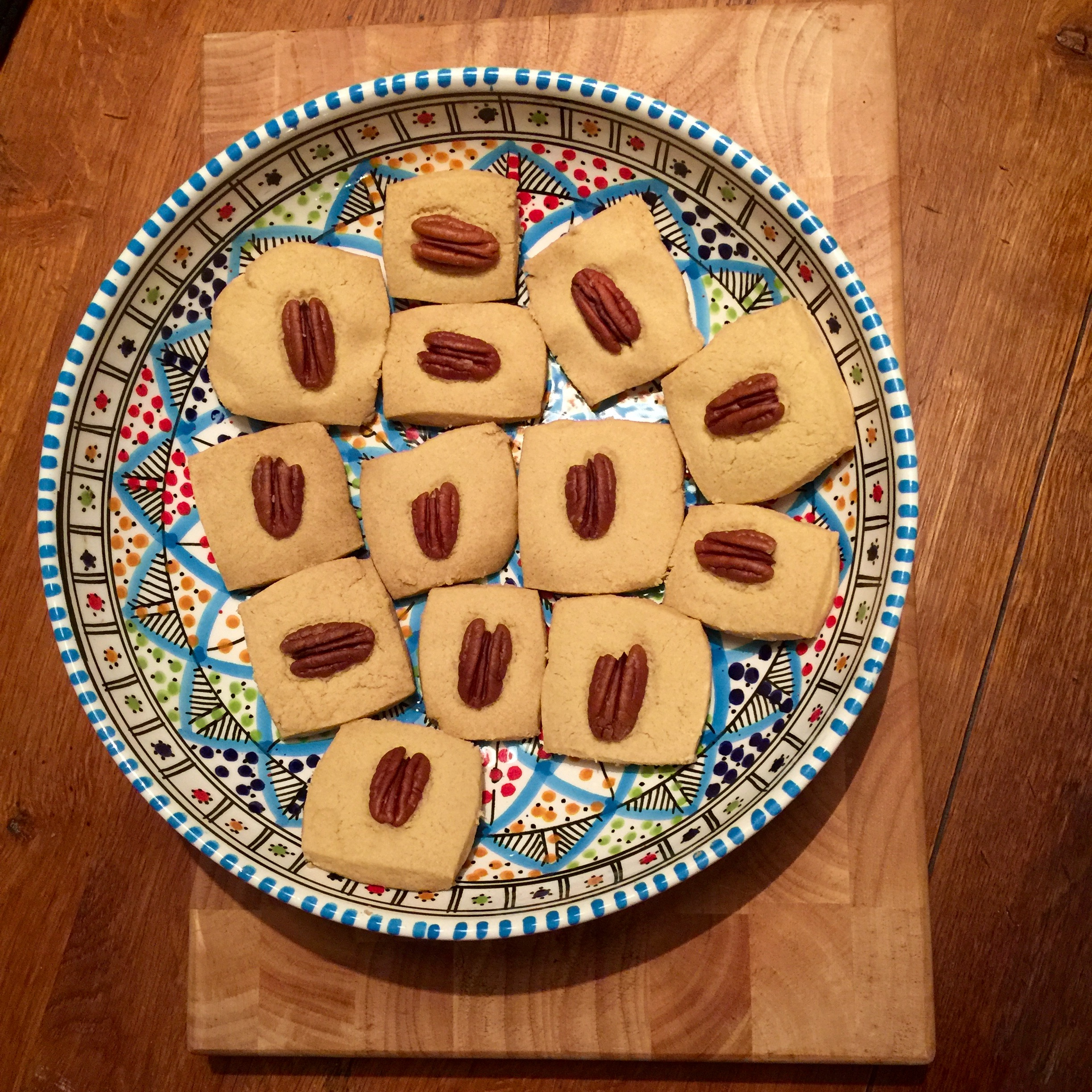
- Tahini cookies
- Course: Dessert
- Main ingredients: Tahini, flour, sugar, butter, rose water
- Variations: Tahini mixed with date molasses, rose water

Tahini cookie is a cookie made of tahini, flour, sugar and butter and usually topped with almonds or pine nuts.

== Preparation ==
The traditional way to prepare tahini cookies is to combine flour, sugar and butter until it creates a crumbly mixture before adding in the raw tahini. Balls of dough are then shaped into round, flat cookies, oftentimes with almonds or pine nuts pressed into them. The baked cookie resembles a shortbread. Variations that include adding cinnamon, rose water, orange blossom water, date molasses or grape molasses are widespread.

== See also ==
- List of biscuits and cookies
