= Stuffed apples =

Apples stuffed with lamb and rice

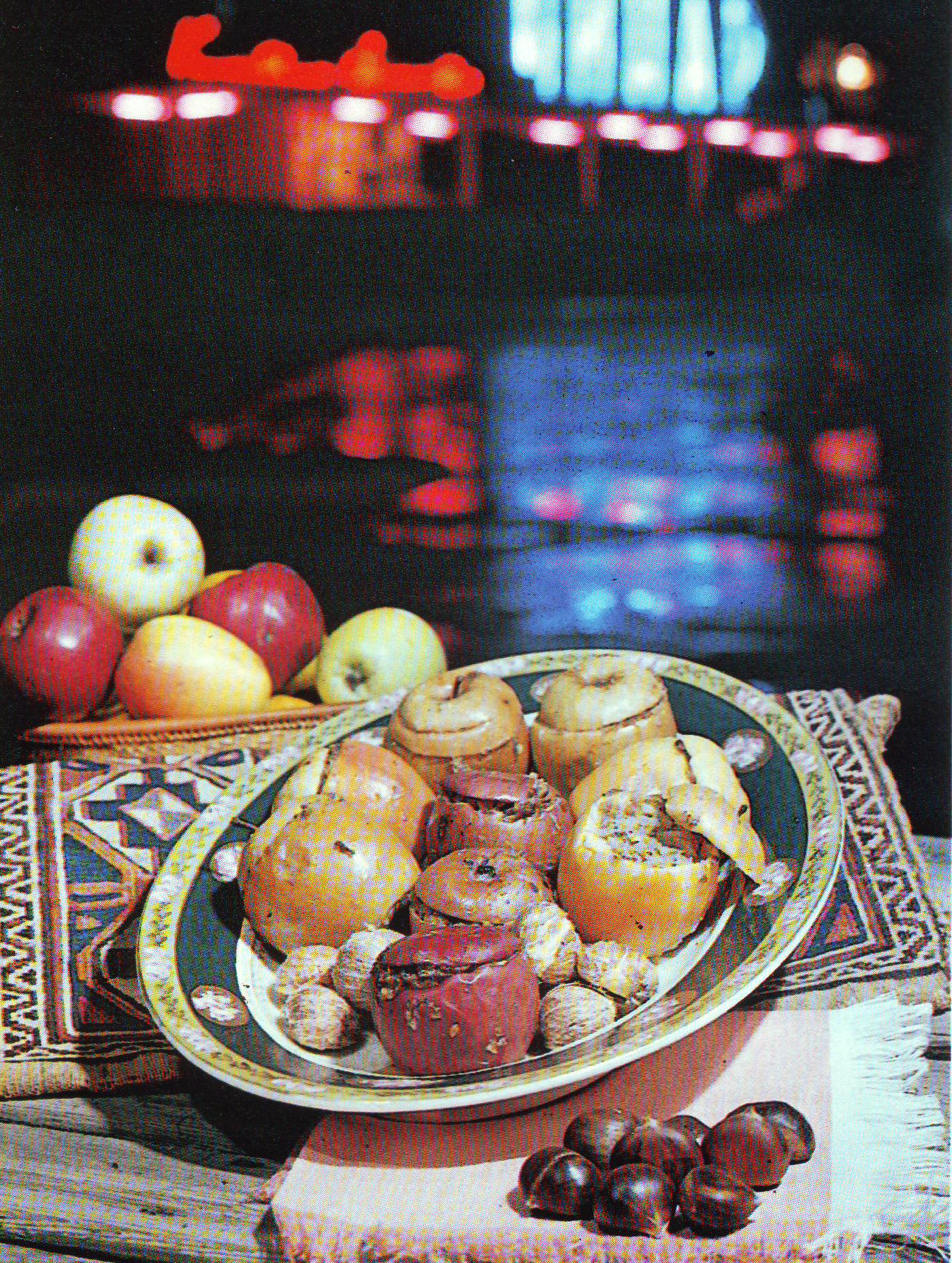
- Region or state: Armenia, Azerbaijan, Iran, Turkey
- Serving temperature: Hot

Stuffed apples (Armenian: լցոնած խնձոր, Azerbaijani: alma dolması, Persian: دلمه سیب, Turkish: Elma dolması) are made of apples stuffed with meat (lamb) and rice. The ingredients typically include green apples, minced meat, rice, onion, tomato paste, parsley, mint, cinnamon, salt, black pepper, and vegetable oil.

Armenian stuffed apples are made with apples stuffed with minced meat, parsley, mint, tarragon, black pepper, salt, raisins, apricots, walnuts, allspice, cinnamon, sumac, cumin, sumac flavored grape syrup, sautéed onions and garlic. This type of stuffed apples is called Etchmiadzin Dolma.

Iranian stuffed apples are made with apples that are stuffed with onion, turmeric, cloves, butter, minced meat, rice, grape syrup, cinnamon, pepper, lemon juice, and brown sugar.

In most variations, the apples are cooked in sumac flavored grape juice or syrup.

== Sweet stuffed apples ==
There also is a meatless variant of the filling that is made from a sauteed mixture of diced apples, diced pears, walnuts, hazelnuts, currants, butter, cinnamon, cloves, and star anise. The hollowed out apples are stuffed with the mixture and baked in the oven. This version may be garnished with powdered sugar and is especially popular in Armenia.

== See also ==
- List of stuffed dishes
