= Date juice =

Drink

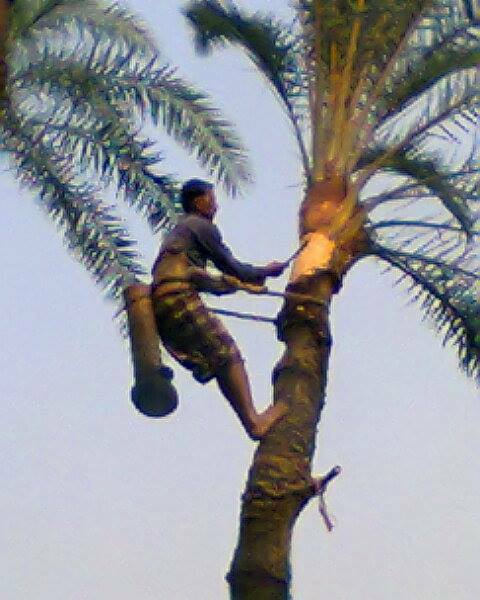
Preparation to collecting date sap from tree

Date palm juice or Date palm sap or Khejur Ras (Bengali: খেজুর রস, romanized: Khejur Rosh) is sweet sap extracted from the Date Palm trees of Bengal in winter. It contains high natural sugars and various nutrients. The sap is usually collected early in the morning in containers and consumed fresh, often within hours of collection to preserve its natural sweetness and delicate flavor. It is a habitat for a diverse range of microbial species mostly lactic acid bacteria such as Leuconostoc and Lactobacillus which are usually known as beneficial microbes.

Bangladesh produces around 20,000 tonnes of date molasses each year. The Kalkini Upazila region in Bangladesh, is mostly famous for its date juice and date molasses/Gur.

== Role as a potential source of Nipah virus ==
Raw date palm sap has been implicated in the transmission of Nipah virus in parts of South Asia, particularly Bangladesh and India. Fruit bats of the genus Pteropus, the natural reservoirs of the virus, are known to visit date palm trees to feed on the sap. During this process, they may contaminate the sap with saliva, urine, or feces, introducing the virus into the collection pots.

Several outbreaks of Nipah virus have been epidemiologically linked to the consumption of fresh, raw date palm juice. The risk is heightened during the harvesting season, when sap is collected and consumed without boiling or processing.

Preventive measures—such as covering sap collection sites with bamboo skirts to block bat access—have been promoted as effective interventions. Public health authorities also recommend boiling sap before consumption or avoiding raw sap altogether to minimize infection risks.
