= Date honey =

Syrup extracted from dates

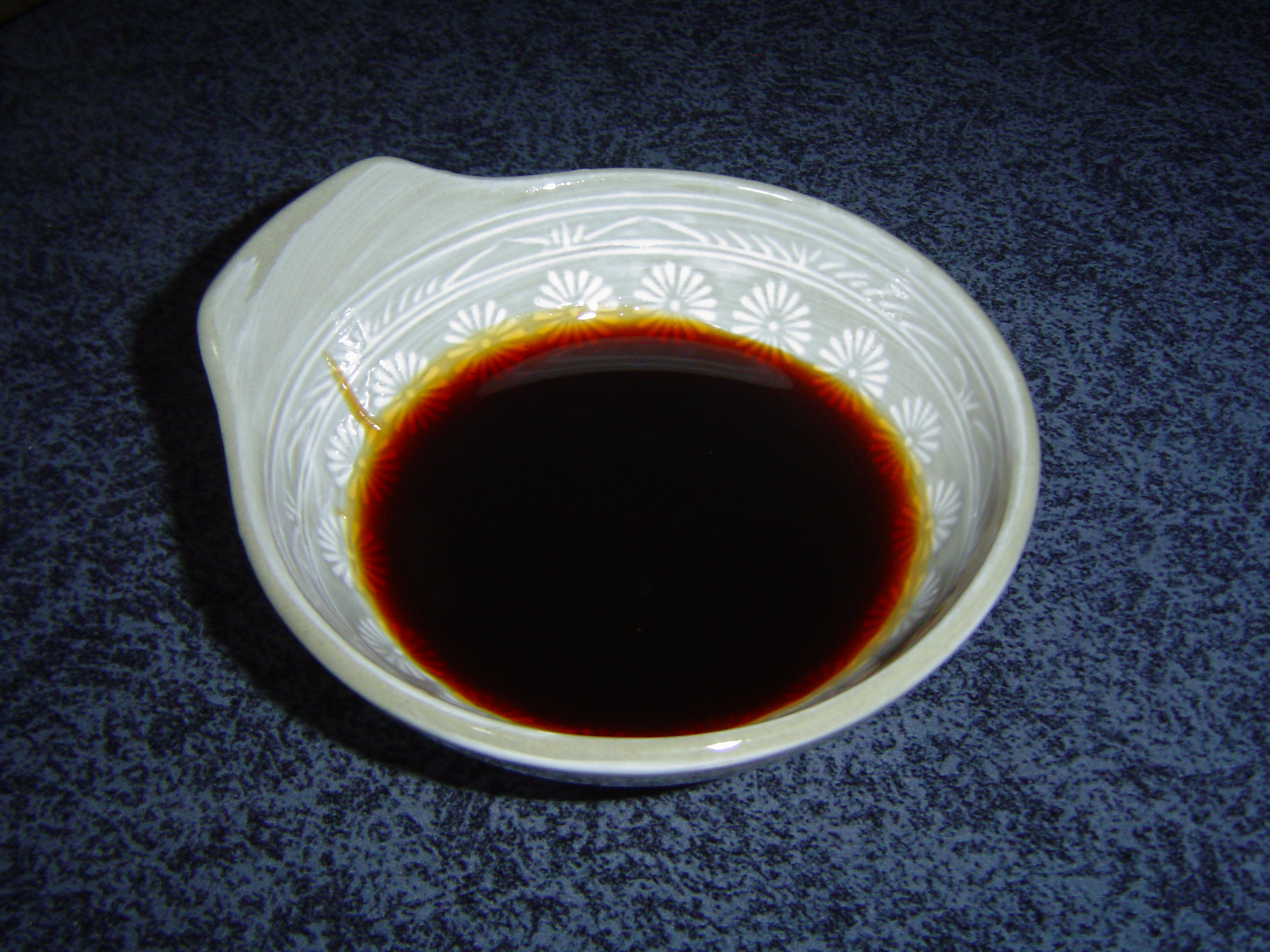
Rub is a thick syrup extracted from dates.

Date honey, date syrup, date molasses, Debes (Arabic: دِبس, pronounced [dibs]), or rub (Arabic: رُب, pronounced [rubb]) (Note: Hebrew: דְּבַש תמרים, romanized: dvash tmarim or סילאן, silan; Persian: شیره خرما) is a thick dark brown, very sweet fruit syrup extracted from dates. It is widely used in Middle Eastern, North African, and South Asian cuisine.

== History ==
Date syrup has been used for thousands of years. It was abundant in desserts in ancient Mesopotamia. Book of Deuteronomy in the Hebrew Bible, in describing the abundance of the Holy Land, includes honey among its bounties. Rabbinic texts such as the Jerusalem Talmud and Sifre interpret this honey as date honey rather than bee honey. Archaeological evidence from Jerusalem supports the use of date honey during this period. A storage jar, marked with a palm tree and found in a room of a building destroyed during the siege of Jerusalem in 586 BCE, indicates that date honey was stored there.

First-century Jewish historian Josephus, in his account of the oases of Jericho and the various date varieties grown in this region of Judaea, notes that "the better kinds [of dates], when pressed, yield an excellent honey not much inferior in sweetness to other honey." From this same period, remains of an installation identified as a date press used for producing date honey were discovered at the nearby settlement of Qumran.

== Nutritional aspects ==
Date syrup is rich in the monosaccharides glucose and fructose. This means that most of its sugar content is absorbed into the bloodstream, and it raises the blood glucose levels more efficiently and immediately than other syrups. It is therefore highly suitable for people suffering from hypoglycaemia, for those with sucrose intolerance or those with pancreatic problems who have difficulty absorbing disaccharides. Date syrup is higher in magnesium and potassium than some natural sweeteners such as maple syrup and honey, and it has been a popular alternative to sugar in recent years. It is also rich in antioxidants due to its high phenolic and flavonoid content and has been shown to exhibit anti-inflammatory activity.

== In national cuisines ==
It is used widely in Libya, usually with asida, a porridge-like dessert.

In Iranian and Iraqi cuisine, date syrup is used to sweeten tahini, consumed at breakfast. An alternative is grape syrup.

In Algeria, date syrup is used in desserts such as baghrir.

In the Middle East, date syrup is used for flavoring chicken and potatoes. They are rubbed in date syrup mixed with cardamom, salt, and olive oil, and then rolled in sesame before being fried in olive oil or baked in the oven as a whole. Date honey is also used as a sauce for stuffed vegetables, such as onions and turnips, and as an ingredient in a semolina cake called basbousa, which gives the cake a honey-like taste.

Bangladesh produces around 20,000 tonnes of date molasses in each year. The Kalkini Upazila region of Bangladesh is famous for its date juice and date molasses.

== See also ==
- Grape syrup
- Pomegranate molasses
- Pekmez
- List of syrups
