= Tahini =

Middle Eastern condiment made from sesame

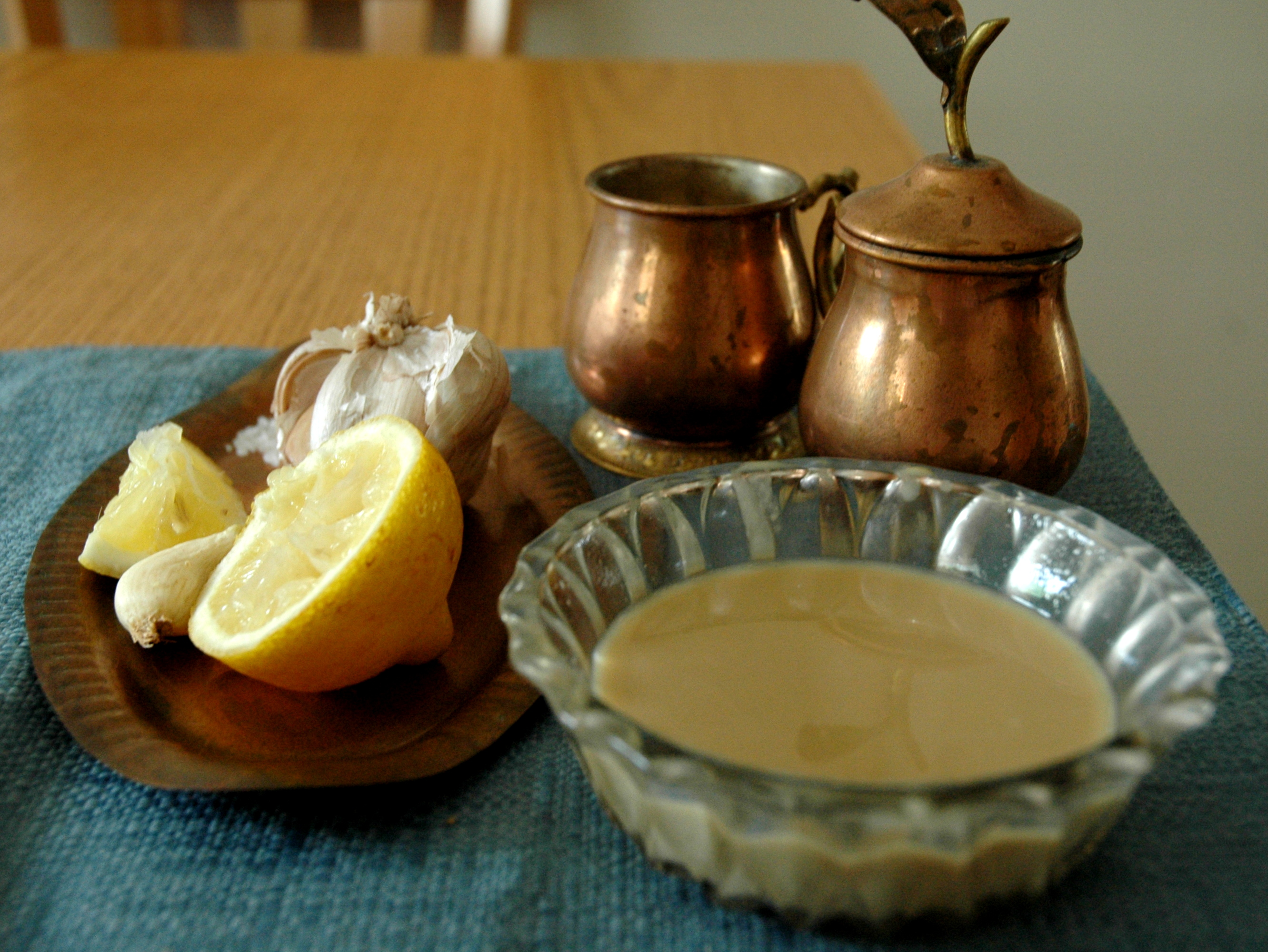
- Tahini next to lemon and whole garlic
- Alternative names: Tahinia, tahin, tahina, tahine, etc.
- Type: Spread or dip, ingredient or filling in other dishes
- Region or state: West Asia, Eastern Mediterranean, South Caucasus, parts of North Africa
- Main ingredients: Sesame seeds

Tahini (/təˈhiːni, tɑː-/; Arabic: طحينة, romanized: ṭaḥīna, or, in Iraq, راشي, rāshī) is a Middle Eastern condiment (a seed butter) made from ground sesame seeds. The most common variety comes from hulled seeds, but unhulled ones can also be used; the latter variety is slightly bitter, but more nutritious. The seeds are more commonly roasted than raw. Tahini can be served by itself (as a dip), made into a salad dressing, or used as a major ingredient in hummus, baba ghanoush, or halva.

Tahini is used in the cuisines of the Middle East and Eastern Mediterranean, the South Caucasus, the Balkans, South Asia, Central Asia, and amongst Cypriots, Ashkenazi Jews, as well as parts of Russia and North Africa. Sesame paste, used in some East Asian cuisines, may differ only slightly from tahini.

== Etymology ==
Tahini is of Arabic origin and comes from a colloquial Levantine Arabic pronunciation of ṭaḥīna (طحينة), or more accurately ṭaḥīniyya (طحينية), whence also English "tahina" and Hebrew ṭḥina טחינה. It is derived from the Classical Arabic root ط ح ن Ṭ-Ḥ-N, which as a verb طحن ṭaḥana means "to grind", and also produces the word طحين ṭaḥīn, "flour" in some dialects. The word tahini had appeared in English by the late 1930s. In earlier English-language sources, it is referred to as "sesame butter" or "sesame seed butter".

== History ==
The oldest mention of sesame is in a cuneiform document written 4,000 years ago that describes the custom of serving the gods sesame wine. Historian Herodotus writes about the cultivation of sesame 3,500 years ago in the region of the Tigris and Euphrates in Mesopotamia (modern day Iraq). It was mainly used as a source of oil.

In the 10th-century Arabic cookbook Kitab al-Tabikh, a recipe for ground sesame is mentioned; recipes call for its use as a condiment or to be eaten with bread.

Tahini is mentioned as an ingredient of hummus kasa, a recipe transcribed in an anonymous 13th-century Arabic cookbook, Kitab Wasf al-Atima al-Mutada.

In his 14th-century work Kaftor va-Perach (Hebrew: כפתור ופרח), Ishtori Haparchi wrote that the inhabitants of the Middle East in his time consumed tahini, made by grinding sesame seeds and mixing them with date honey.

Sesame paste is an ingredient in some Chinese and Japanese dishes; Sichuan cuisine uses it in some recipes for dandan noodles. Sesame paste is also used in Indian cuisine.

In North America, sesame tahini, along with other raw nut butters, was available by 1940 in health food stores.

== Preparation and storage ==
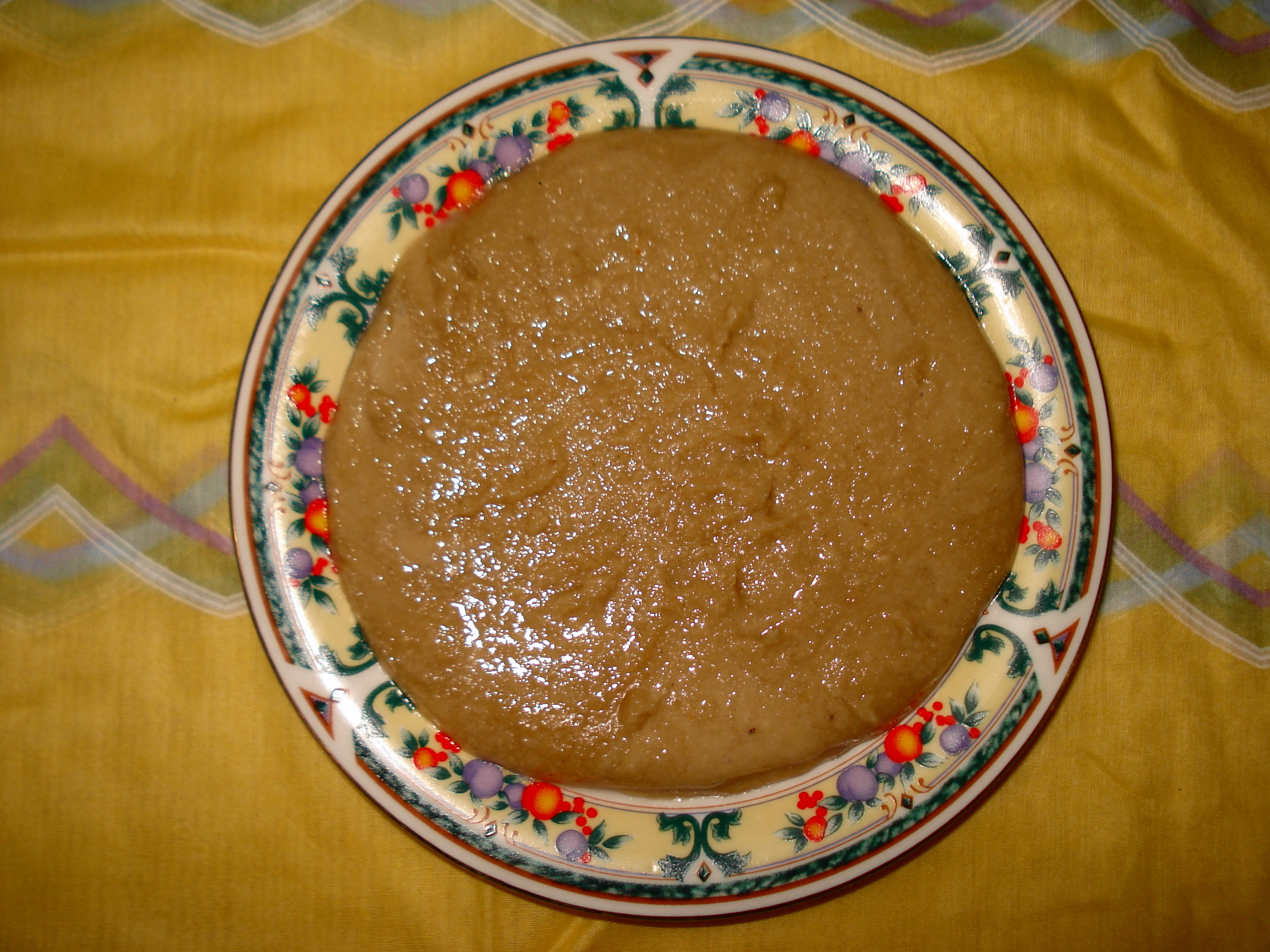
Tahini made with roasted sesame, dubbed "red tahini"

Tahini is made from sesame seeds that are soaked in water and then crushed to separate the bran from the kernels. The crushed seeds are then soaked again in salt water with a high salt content that causes the bran to sink. The floating kernels are skimmed off the surface, toasted, and ground to produce an oily paste. It can also be prepared with untoasted seeds and called "raw tahini".

Because of tahini's high oil content, some manufacturers recommend refrigeration to prevent spoilage. Others do not recommend refrigeration, as it makes the product more viscous and more difficult to serve.

The color of the produced tahini is affected by the kind of sesame used, untoasted sesame produces a bright-colored tahini; toasted or unshelled sesame produces tahini with a darker color, black sesame produces a tahini with a deep black color (dubbed "black tahini").

Nutritional value per 100 g (3.5 oz)
- Energy: 2,477 kJ (592 kcal)
- Carbohydrates: 21.50 g
- Sugars: 0.49 g
- Dietary fiber: 4.7 g
- Fat: 53.01 g
- Saturated: 7.423 g
- Monounsaturated: 20.016 g
- Polyunsaturated: 23.232 g
- Protein: 17.40 g
Vitamins and minerals
Vitamins	Quantity %DV^{†}
Vitamin A	67 IU
Thiamine (B1)	133% 1.590 mg
Riboflavin (B2)	9% 0.120 mg
Niacin (B3)	35% 5.640 mg
Vitamin B6	9% 0.150 mg
Folate (B9)	25% 98 μg
Vitamin C	5% 4.2 mg
Minerals	Quantity %DV^{†}
Calcium	11% 141 mg
Iron	25% 4.42 mg
Magnesium	23% 95 mg
Phosphorus	63% 790 mg
Potassium	15% 459 mg
Sodium	2% 35 mg
Zinc	42% 4.62 mg
- Other constituents: Quantity
- Water: 3.00 g
- Link to USDA Database entry
- ^{†}Percentages estimated using US recommendations for adults, except for potassium, which is estimated based on expert recommendation from the National Academies.

== Nutrition ==
Tahini is 53% fat, 22% carbohydrates, 17% protein, and 3% water (table). In a reference amount of 100 g (3.5 oz), it supplies 592 calories, and is a rich source of thiamine (133% of the Daily Value, DV), several dietary minerals (25-63% DV), niacin, and folate (25-35% DV, table). Tahini is a moderate source (10-19% DV) of calcium and potassium (table).

== Culinary uses ==
Tahini-based sauces are common in Middle Eastern restaurants as a side dish or as a garnish, usually including lemon juice, salt, and garlic, and thinned with water. Hummus is made of cooked, mashed chickpeas typically blended with tahini, lemon juice and salt. Tahini sauce is also a popular topping for meat and vegetables in Middle Eastern cuisine. A sweet spread, ḥalawa ṭaḥīniyya ("sweet tahini"), is a type of halva sweet. It sometimes has mashed or sliced pistachio pieces sprinkled inside or on top.

In many parts of the Middle East, it is spread on bread and eaten as a quick snack or breakfast. Alternatively, bread can be dipped into tahini sweetened by a syrup such as grape syrup, carob syrup, or date syrup; the sweetener may vary by region.

=== For sweets ===
Tahini is also used in sweet dishes such as cakes, cookies, halva, and ice cream.

=== By region ===
==== Armenia ====
In Armenia, tahini can be used as a sauce to put on lahmajoun.

==== China ====
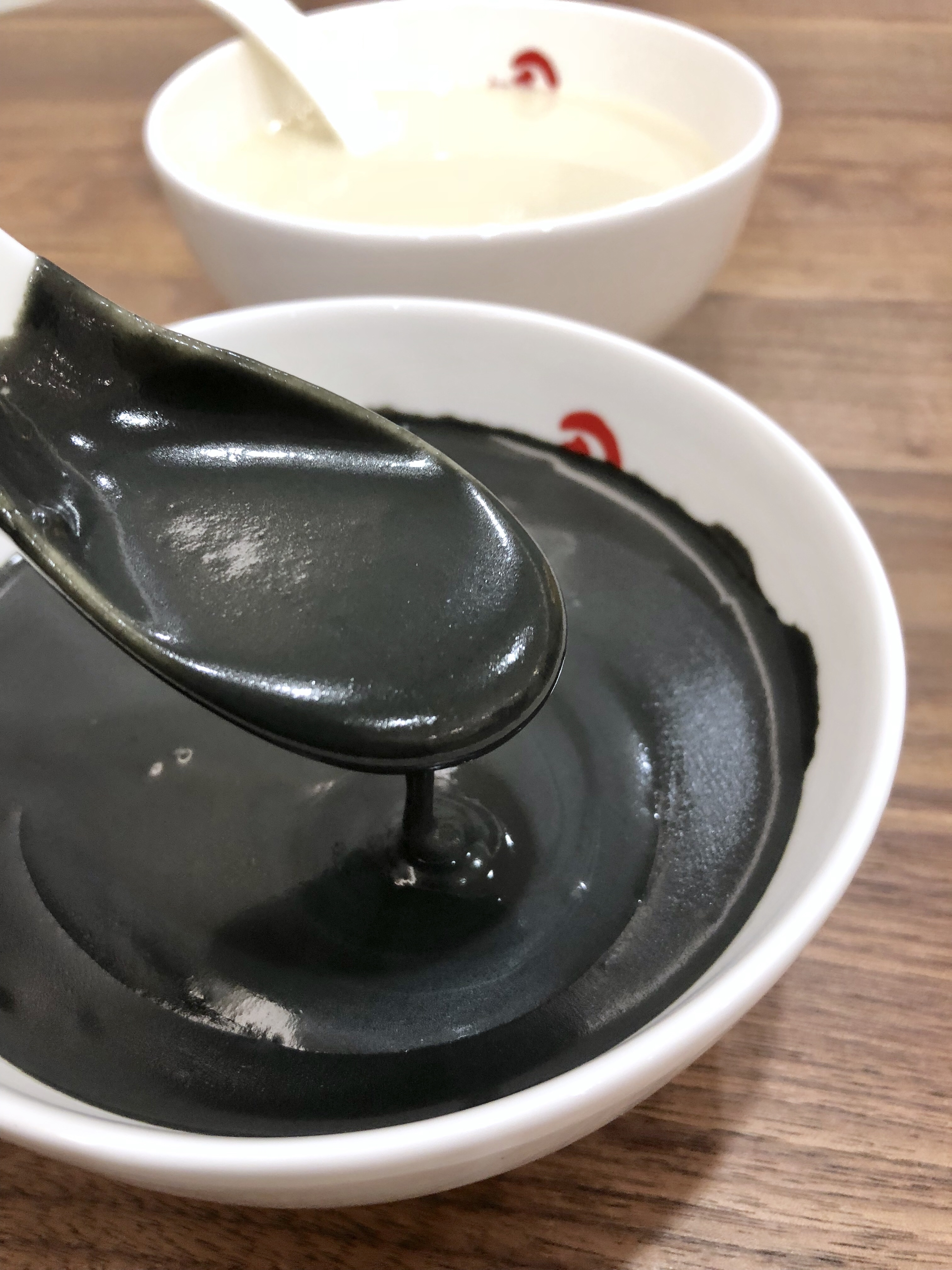
Black sesame paste, sometimes called "black tahini" (not to be confused with Qizha, also called black tahini), is popular in Chinese cuisine

In Chinese cuisine, sesame paste (zhīmájiàng) is used as a condiment in many dishes. Chinese sesame paste differs from the Middle Eastern tahini in that the sesame is roasted; the paste is much darker, and has far less astringency. Often, white sesame paste is used in salty dishes, while black sesame paste is used in desserts (not to be confused with black sesame soup, which is made in a different manner from sesame paste). Sesame paste is a primary condiment in the hot dry noodles of Hubei cuisine and ma jiang mian (sesame paste noodles) of Northeastern Chinese cuisine and Taiwanese cuisine. Sesame paste is also used as a bread or mantou spread, and may be paired with or baked into bing (Chinese flatbread). Sesame paste is used as a seasoning, condiment and dip in cold dishes (such as liangfen) and hot pot.

==== Cyprus ====
In Cyprus, tahini, locally pronounced as tashi, is used as a dip for bread and sometimes in pitta souvlaki rather than tzatziki, which is customary in Greece; it is also used to make "tahinopitta" (tahini pie).

==== Egypt ====
In Egypt, tehina is a fundamental component of the country's cuisine, serving as an ingredient, a condiment, and a dipping sauce. Derived from toasted, hulled sesame seeds ground into a creamy paste, tehina boasts a rich, nutty flavor with a slightly bitter undertone.

In Egyptian culinary traditions, tehina is often made by blending it with lemon juice, garlic, and water, resulting in a smooth, ivory-colored condiment. This sauce is commonly seasoned with salt and cumin to enhance its flavor. The consistency can be adjusted by varying the amount of water, making it suitable as a dip, dressing, or accompaniment to various dishes.

Tehina sauce holds a prominent place in Egyptian cuisine, frequently accompanying dishes such as ta'miya, ful medames and grilled meats like kofta. Its creamy texture and tangy profile complement the robust flavors of most foods, making it a staple on Egyptian dining tables.

==== Greece ====
In Greece, tahini is used as a spread on bread either alone or topped with honey or jam. Jars of tahini ready-mixed with honey or cocoa are available in the breakfast food aisles of Greek supermarkets.

==== Iran ====
In Iran, tahini is called ardeh in Persian. It is used to make halvardeh, a kind of halva made of tahini, sugar, egg whites, and other ingredients. It is also eaten during breakfast, usually with an accompanying sweet substance, such as grape syrup, date syrup, honey, or jam. Ardeh and halvardeh are among the souvenirs of the Iranian cities of Yazd and Ardakan.

==== Iraq ====
In Iraq, tahini is known as rashi, and is mixed with date syrup (rub) to make a sweet dessert usually eaten with bread.

==== Israel ====
In Israel, tahini (ṭḥina) is a staple foodstuff. It is served as a dip with flat bread or pita, a topping for many foods such as falafel, sabich, Jerusalem mixed grill and shawarma, and as an ingredient in various spreads. It is also used as a sauce for meat and fish, and in sweet desserts like halva, halva ice cream and tahini cookies. It is also served baked in the oven with kufta made of lamb or beef with spices and herbs, or with a whole fish in the coastal areas and the Sea of Galilee.

==== Levant ====
In the Levant, tahini is a staple food and is used in various spreads and culinary preparations. It is the main ingredient of the Ṭaraṭor (sauce) which is used with falafel and shawarma. It is also used as a sauce for meat and fish. It is an ingredient in a seafood dish called ṣiyadiyeh.

==== Palestine ====
In the Gaza Strip, a rust-colored variety known as "red tahina" is served in addition to ordinary tahina. It is achieved by a different and lengthier process of roasting the sesame seeds, and has a more intense taste. Red tahina is used in sumagiyya (lamb with chard and sumac) and salads native to the falaḥeen from the surrounding villages, as well as southern Gaza.

In the West Bank city of Nablus, tahina is mixed with qizḥa paste to make "black tahina", used in baking. It is distinct from the "black tahini" made from black sesame seeds.

It is also commonly sweetened with grape syrup and eaten with pita bread.

==== Türkiye ====
In Türkiye, tahini is mixed with pekmez to make tahin-pekmez, which is often served as a breakfast item or after meals as a sweet dip for breads.

== See also ==
- List of Middle Eastern dishes
- List of dips
- List of sesame seed dishes
- List of spreads
