= Vin cuit =

Dessert wine produced in France

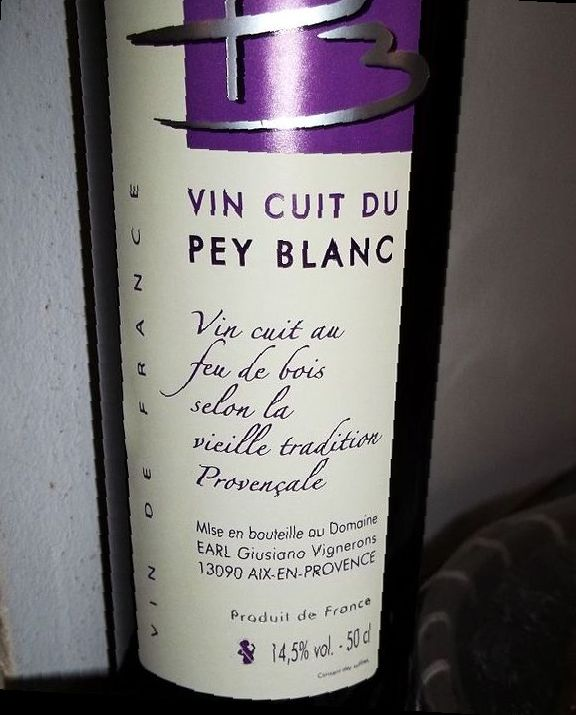
Vin cuit from Provence

Vin cuit or cooked wine is an artisanal dessert wine produced in Provence, France. It is made by heating grape juice without boiling it so that the grape juice becomes concentrated and syrupy. It is then fermented in barrels. The alcohol content is around 14%.

Vin cuit is not a fortified wine. Its Italian counterpart is the vino cotto.

Production of this wine style is limited. It is regularly served on Christmas Eve.

== Description ==
Vin cuit is a sweet wine that is mainly drunk as a dessert wine. It usually has an alcohol content of around 14 to 15 percent by volume.

Because the sweetness was achieved by artificially increasing the sugar content through cooking, the vin cuit is called "vin doux artisanal" (artisan sweet wine) in France, as opposed to the "vin doux naturel" (natural sweet wine, equivalent to the German liqueur wine), in which the fermentation of unthickened grape must is stopped by adding high-percentage drinking alcohol, thereby retaining much of the natural original sweetness of the grape in the wine.

Provençal winemakers who have revived the production of vin cuit are seeking AOC certification.

== See also ==
- Mulled wine
