= Vincotto =

Italian dessert paste

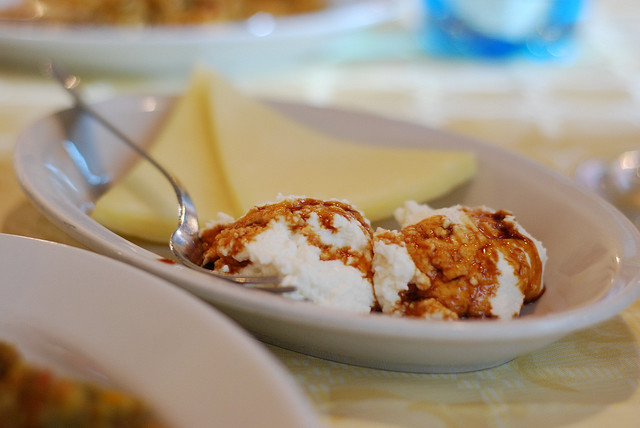
Ricotta with vincotto

Vincotto (lit. 'cooked wine') is a dark, sweet, thick paste produced in rural areas of Italy. It is made by the slow cooking and reduction over many hours of non-fermented grape must until it has been reduced to about one-fifth of its original volume and the sugars present have caramelized. It can be made from a number of varieties of local red wine grapes, including Primitivo, Negroamaro, and Malvasia Nera, and before the grapes are picked they are allowed to wither naturally on the vine for about thirty days. In Roman times it was known as sapa in Latin and epsima in Greek, the same names that are often used for it in Italy and Cyprus, respectively, today.

== Description ==
Although it may be used as a basis to make sweet vinegar, vincotto has a pleasant flavor and is not a type of vinegar. This additional product is called "vinegar of vincotto", "vincotto vinegar" or "vincotto balsamic" and can be used in the same way as a good mellow balsamic vinegar.

Vincotto appears to be related to defrutum and other forms of grape juice boiled down to varying strengths (carenum, sapa) that were produced in ancient Rome. Defrutum was used to preserve, sweeten, and/or flavor many foods (including wine), by itself or with honey or garum. Defrutum was also consumed as a drink when diluted with water, or fermented into a heady Roman "wine". (Note: defrutum should not be confused with passum, a wine made from fermented raisins that originated in ancient Carthage and was popular in ancient Rome. Passum was therefore more similar to modern Vin Santo than to vincotto.)

Over many centuries, the vincotto produced in Basilicata and the Salento area of Apulia was further developed into several different varieties of higher quality and culinary sophistication and is produced from the slow reduction together of a blend of cooked grape must and of a wine that has started to spoil and sour, attaining the consistency of dense non-alcoholic syrup. This tradition goes back to the times of the ancient Romans, when grape musts were reduced over heat to facilitate conservation and transportation.

In Basilicata, vincotto is a key ingredient of several traditional dishes such as lagana chiapputa, pasta with walnuts, almonds, pine nuts, and raisin, and pan minisc', a dessert enriched with flour, sugar, and spices.

== See also ==
- List of grape dishes
- Vino cotto
- Vin cuit
