= Vino cotto =

Type of wine

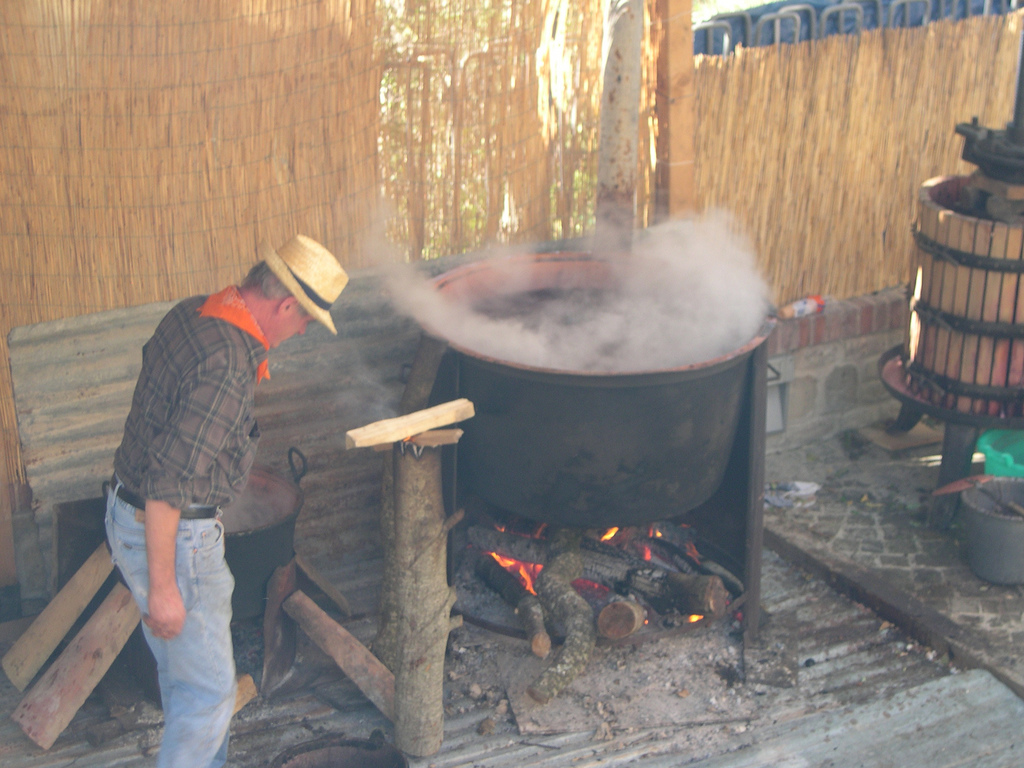
The vapours of vino cotto

Vino cotto (lit. 'cooked wine'; Abruzzese: vi'cotto or vi'cuotte) is a type of wine from the Italian regions of Marche and Abruzzo, made primarily in the hills of the province of Ascoli Piceno and the province of Macerata. It is a strong ruby-colored wine, usually semi-sweet, and traditionally drunk in small glasses with puddings and cheese.

It is produced from the must of any of the local varieties of grapes, heated in a copper vessel until reduced to a half or third of its original volume, and then fermented. It can be aged for years, barrels being topped up with each harvest. It is mostly made by private individuals for their own use as, under EU rules, it cannot be sold as wine. A few wineries produce and sell it commercially as a foodstuff.

This vino cotto should not be confused with the naturally sweet syrup obtained by cooking the grape must, not fermenting it. Although southern Italian regions such as Calabria call the syrup vino cotto or vincotto, the Marche region and Apulia call it sapa. It is known throughout the Mediterranean by various other names as well.

== History ==
Vino cotto production is documented as being produced in the 3rd century BC by the Picenes and again from the 16th century AD. The Roman patricians, the emperors and the popes were reputed to savour this drink at the end of their lavish banquets, although the sources are vague between the various forms of cooked wine.

== Winemaking ==
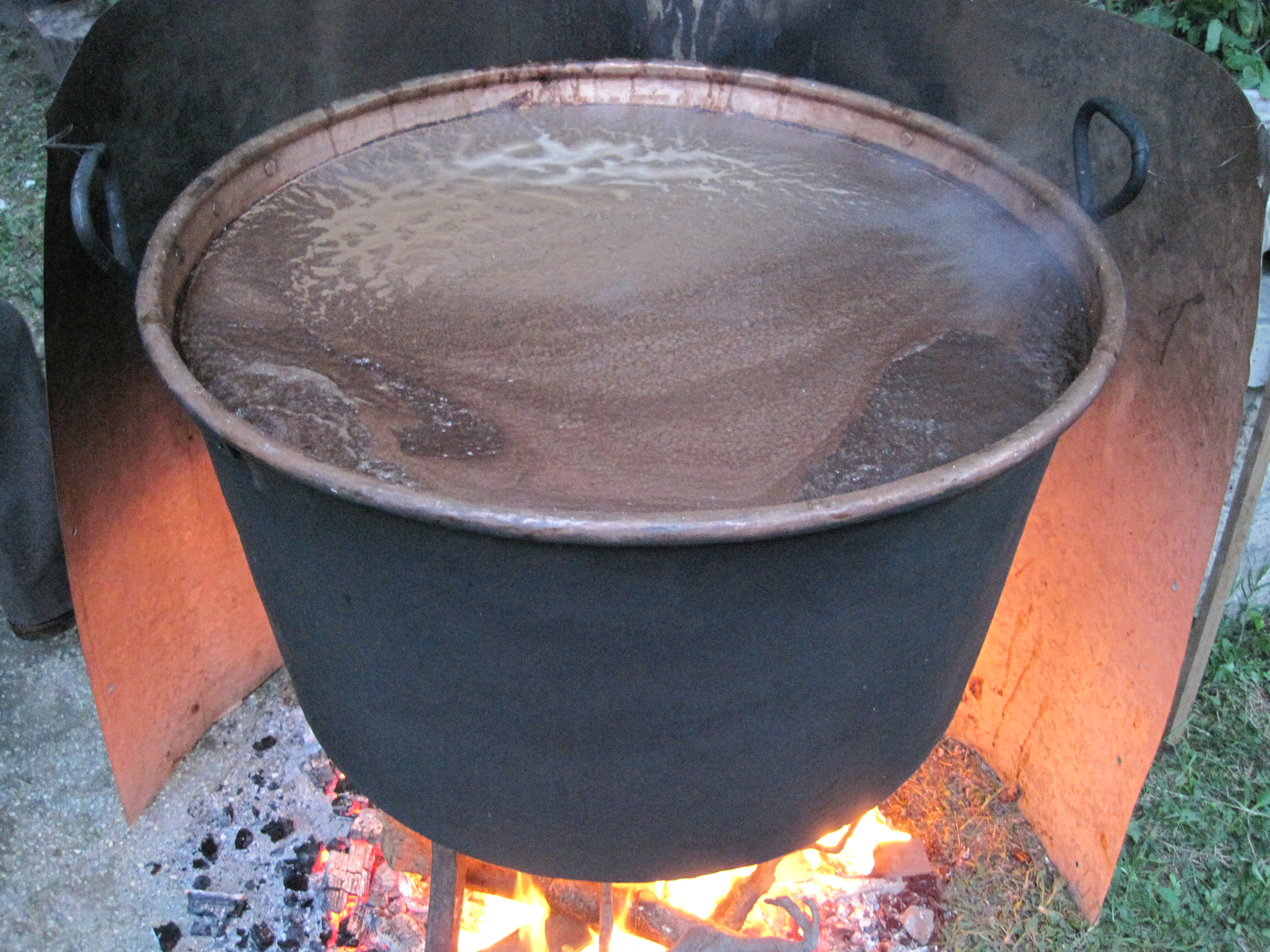
The copper cauldron where the must is boiled

The raw material comes from any of the red and white grapes of the region, particularly damaged bunches, and may include the pomace left over from normal winemaking. Thus it is a way to ensure that none of the harvest is wasted. This material is crushed and cooked in a large cauldron over a fire for 24 hours, which gives its characteristic aromas. Traditionally two men attended it, taking turns to sleep and constantly stirring and skimming off the scum that formed on the surface. The must is cooked until a half or a third of the volume remains, depending on how sweet it is to be. In the Marche some add a quince for every quintal of must to flavor the drink. Once cooled, the must is transferred to oak or chestnut casks where it is left to ferment. It is racked off the lees once or twice.

The wine is aged in old wine barrels for at least a year. It is often combined with and used to top up previous years' barrels. Due to the cooking, the wine is very stable and keeps well in heat and open containers.

The Marche authorities have set down a specification for the method of production of vino cotto.

== Legal status ==
Although it is recognized as a prodotto agroalimentare tradizionale (PAT) by the Italian Ministry of Agriculture, Food and Forestry, it cannot be sold as wine and very little is produced commercially. EU rules prohibit the use of the description "wine" for drinks produced by heating the wort unless they are Marsala, a more recent innovation than vino cotto.

== See also ==
- Mulled wine
- Vincotto
- Vin cuit
