= Mechanical Bull Tour =

2014–15 concert tour by Kings of Leon

- Worldwide tour by Kings of Leon
- Promotional poster for the tour
- Location: Worldwide
- Associated album: Mechanical Bull
- Start date: February 5, 2014
- End date: March 15, 2015
- Legs: 7
- No. of shows: 53 in North America; 1 in Asia; 12 in Europe; 4 in South America; 70 total

Kings of Leon concert chronology
- Come Around Sundown World Tour (2010–11); Mechanical Bull Tour (2014)

The Mechanical Bull Tour was the third headlining tour by American rock band Kings of Leon. The tour was in support of their sixth studio album, Mechanical Bull (2013) and began on February 5, 2014, in Atlanta, and ended on March 15, 2015, in Santiago.

== Background ==
The tour was first announced in October 2013. In November 2013, while in Australia, Caleb Followill confirmed to triple j's Veronica and Lewis that the band would be returning there in 2014 for the tour. In December 2013, dates for the second North America leg were announced. The third North America leg was announced on April 21, 2014 Due to an injury to Nathan Followill, eleven shows in August were canceled.

== Opening acts ==
- Baba Shrimp (Zurich)
- Gary Clark, Jr. (North America leg 1)
- Haim (Milton Keynes Bowl – England)
- Kongos (North America leg 3)
- The Last Internationale (Milton Keynes Bowl – England)
- Local Natives (North America leg 2)
- searching Alaska
- Twin Atlantic (Milton Keynes Bowl – England)
- White Lies (Europe leg)
- Young the Giant (North America leg 3)

== Setlist ==
1. "Charmer"
2. "Rock City"
3. "My Party"
4. "Temple"
5. "On Call"
6. "Family Tree"
7. "Closer"
8. "The Immortals"
9. "Back Down South"
10. "Wait for Me"
11. "Supersoaker"
12. "Milk"
13. "Pyro"
14. "Tonight"
15. "Radioactive"
16. "The Bucket"
17. "Don't Matter"
18. "Molly's Chambers"
19. "Four Kicks"
20. "Be Somebody"
21. "Notion"
22. "Cold Desert"
23. "Use Somebody"

Encore

24. "Crawl"
25. "Black Thumbnail"
26. "Sex on Fire"

== Tour dates ==
Date	City	Country	Venue
North America Leg 1
February 5, 2014	Atlanta	United States	Philips Arena
February 7, 2014	Nashville	United States	Bridgestone Arena
February 9, 2014	Louisville	United States	KFC Yum! Center
February 11, 2014	Auburn Hills	United States	The Palace of Auburn Hills
February 14, 2014	New York City	United States	Madison Square Garden
February 15, 2014	Uncasville	United States	Mohegan Sun Arena
February 18, 2014	Columbus	United States	Schottenstein Center
February 19, 2014	Philadelphia	United States	Wells Fargo Center
February 21, 2014	Washington, D.C.	United States	Verizon Center
February 23, 2014	London	Canada	Budweiser Gardens
February 24, 2014	Montreal	Canada	Bell Centre
February 26, 2014	Toronto	Canada	Air Canada Centre
February 28, 2014	Boston	United States	TD Garden
March 5, 2014	Kansas City	United States	Sprint Center
March 6, 2014	Minneapolis	United States	Target Center
March 8, 2014	Chicago	United States	United Center
March 19, 2014	Phoenix	United States	Ak-Chin Pavilion
March 21, 2014	Inglewood	United States	The Forum
March 25, 2014	San Jose	United States	SAP Center
March 27, 2014	Portland	United States	Moda Center
March 30, 2014	Vancouver	Canada	Rogers Arena
April 1, 2014	Calgary	Canada	Scotiabank Saddledome
April 2, 2014	Edmonton	Canada	Rexall Place
April 4, 2014	Saskatoon	Canada	Credit Union Centre
April 8, 2014	Tulsa	United States	BOK Center
April 10, 2014	The Woodlands	United States	Cynthia Woods Mitchell Pavilion
April 11, 2014	New Orleans	United States	Smoothie King Center
Asia
May 28, 2014	Dubai	United Arab Emirates	Atlantis, The Palm
Europe
May 31, 2014	Newcastle upon Tyne	England	St James' Park
June 2, 2014	Amsterdam	Netherlands	Ziggo Dome
June 4, 2014	Hanover	Germany	Expo Plaza
June 9, 2014	Zürich	Switzerland	Hallenstadion
June 11, 2014	Wiesen	Switzerland	Ottakringer Arena
June 13, 2014	Warsaw	Poland	Orange Warsaw Festival
June 17, 2014	Sheffield	England	Motorpoint Arena
June 18, 2014	Manchester	England	Phones 4u Arena
June 20, 2014	Glasgow	Scotland	The SSE Hydro
June 22, 2014	Milton Keynes	England	Milton Keynes Bowl
June 25, 2014	Riga	Latvia	Meža Parks
July 2, 2014	Swansea	Wales	Liberty Stadium
July 4, 2014	Dublin	Ireland	Marlay Park
North America Leg 2
July 31, 2014	Maryland Heights	United States	Verizon Amphitheater
August 1, 2014	Clarkston	United States	DTE Energy Music Theatre
August 3, 2014	Chicago	United States	Lollapalooza
August 5, 2014	Toronto	Canada	Molson Canadian Amphitheatre
August 7, 2014	Hartford	United States	Xfinity Theatre
August 9, 2014	Mansfield	United States	Xfinity Center
September 3, 2014	Virginia Beach	United States	Farm Bureau Live
September 5, 2014	Tampa	United States	MidFlorida Credit Union Amphitheatre
September 6, 2014	West Palm Beach	United States	Cruzan Amphitheatre
September 9, 2014	Atlanta	United States	Aaron's Amphitheatre
September 10, 2014	Birmingham	United States	Oak Mountain Amphitheatre
September 12, 2014	Dallas	United States	Gexa Energy Pavilion
September 13, 2014	Austin	United States	Austin360 Amphitheatre
September 16, 2014	Charlotte	United States	PNC Music Pavilion
September 17, 2014	Raleigh	United States	Walnut Creek Amphitheatre
September 24, 2014	Morrison	United States	Red Rocks Amphitheatre
September 26, 2014	Albuquerque	United States	Isleta Amphitheater
September 27, 2014	Las Vegas	United States	MGM Grand Garden Arena
September 30, 2014	Wheatland	United States	Sleep Train Amphitheatre
October 1, 2014	Concord	United States	Concord Pavilion
October 3, 2014	Los Angeles	United States	Hollywood Bowl
October 5, 2014	Irvine	United States	Verizon Wireless Amphitheatre
October 11, 2014	Guadalajara	Mexico	Arena VFG
October 12, 2014	Mexico City	Mexico	Corona Capital
South America Leg 1
November 1, 2014	São Paulo	Brazil	Circuito Banco do Brasil
November 8, 2014	Rio de Janeiro	Brazil	Circuito Banco do Brasil
North America Leg 3
February 11, 2015	Nashville	United States	SI Swimsuit
March 1, 2015	Honolulu	United States	Neal S. Blaisdell Arena
South America Leg 2
March 13, 2015	Bogotá	Colombia	Estéreo Picnic
March 15, 2015	Santiago	Chile	Lollapalooza Chile

Canceled shows

- 8/10: Saratoga Springs, New York
- 8/13: Wantagh, New York
- 8/15: Bristow, Virginia
- 8/16: Bethel, New York
- 8/19: Darien, New York
- 8/20: Cuyahoga Falls, Ohio
- 8/22: Cincinnati, Ohio
- 8/23: Noblesville, Indiana
- 8/26: Gilford, New Hampshire
- 8/28: Holmdel, New Jersey
- 8/29: Burgettstown, Pennsylvania

== Box office score data ==
Venue	City	Tickets sold / available	Gross revenue
The Palace of Auburn Hills	Auburn Hills	5,954 / 13,185	$263,380
Wells Fargo Center	Philadelphia	9,909 / 12,500	$547,480
Air Canada Centre	Toronto	10,247 / 11,054	$795,142
Moda Center	Portland	6,737 / 8,873	$275,536
Hallenstadion	Zurich	12,405 / 13,000	$1,239,060
DTE Energy Music Theatre	Clarkston	8,738 / 15,038	$246,708
Arena VFG	Guadalajara	9,160 / 11,584	$472,821
TOTAL		63,150 / 85,234	$4,041,568

== Tour bus accident ==
On August 9, 2014, drummer Nathan Followill was injured in a tour bus accident. On their way to their hotel after their show in Mansfield, "a pedestrian jumped in front of their bus, causing the bus to stop short." Followill suffered from broken ribs. Due to the injury the band had to cancel eleven shows from August 10–31.
