= List of number-one urban albums of 2008 (Australia) =

ARIA Charts number-one urban albums of 2008 < 2007 2009 >

Other Australian number-one charts of 2008
- albums
- singles
- urban singles
- dance singles
- club tracks
- digital tracks

Top Australian singles and albums of 2008
- Triple J Hottest 100
- top 25 singles
- top 25 albums

This is a list of albums that reached number-one on the ARIA Urban Albums Chart in 2008. The ARIA Urban Albums Chart is a weekly chart that ranks the best-performing urban albums in Australia. It is published by the Australian Recording Industry Association (ARIA), an organisation that collects music data for the weekly ARIA Charts. To be eligible to appear on the chart, the recording must be an album of a predominantly urban nature.

== Chart history ==
Issue date	Album	Artist(s)	Reference
7 January	Shock Value	Timbaland	
14 January	Shock Value	Timbaland	
21 January	Shock Value	Timbaland	
28 January	Shock Value	Timbaland	
4 February	Shock Value	Timbaland	
11 February	Blazin'	Various Artists	
18 February	Blazin'	Various Artists	
25 February	Good Girl Gone Bad	Rihanna	
3 March	Good Girl Gone Bad	Rihanna	
10 March	Good Girl Gone Bad	Rihanna	
17 March	Good Girl Gone Bad	Rihanna	
24 March	Good Girl Gone Bad	Rihanna	
31 March	Good Girl Gone Bad	Rihanna	
7 April	Step Up 2: The Streets	Various Artists	
14 April	Step Up 2: The Streets	Various Artists	
21 April	Step Up 2: The Streets	Various Artists	
28 April	E=MC²	Mariah Carey	
5 May	Flying Colours	Bliss n Eso	
12 May	E=MC²	Mariah Carey	
19 May	Exclusive	Chris Brown	
26 May	Exclusive	Chris Brown	
2 June	Here I Stand	Usher	
9 June	Here I Stand	Usher	
16 June	Here I Stand	Usher	
23 June	Here I Stand	Usher	
30 June	Exclusive	Chris Brown	
7 July	Good Girl Gone Bad	Rihanna	
14 July	Good Girl Gone Bad	Rihanna	
21 July	Exclusive	Chris Brown	
28 July	Exclusive	Chris Brown	
4 August	Exclusive	Chris Brown	
11 August	Exclusive	Chris Brown	
18 August	Exclusive	Chris Brown	
25 August	Exclusive	Chris Brown	
1 September	Exclusive	Chris Brown	
8 September	Exclusive	Chris Brown	
15 September	Exclusive	Chris Brown	
22 September	Exclusive	Chris Brown	
29 September	Doll Domination	The Pussycat Dolls	
6 October	Doll Domination	The Pussycat Dolls	
13 October	Doll Domination	The Pussycat Dolls	
20 October	Doll Domination	The Pussycat Dolls	
27 October	Doll Domination	The Pussycat Dolls	
3 November	Exclusive	Chris Brown	
10 November	Exclusive	Chris Brown	
17 November	Exclusive	Chris Brown	
24 November	I Am... Sasha Fierce	Beyoncé	
1 December	I Am... Sasha Fierce	Beyoncé	
8 December	I Am... Sasha Fierce	Beyoncé	
15 December	I Am... Sasha Fierce	Beyoncé	
22 December	I Am... Sasha Fierce	Beyoncé	
29 December	I Am... Sasha Fierce	Beyoncé	

== See also ==
- 2008 in music
- List of number-one albums of 2008 (Australia)
