= List of number-one country albums of 2008 (Australia) =

ARIA Charts number-one country albums of 2008 < 2007 2009 >

Other Australian number-one charts of 2008
- albums
- singles
- urban singles
- dance singles
- club tracks
- digital tracks

Top Australian singles and albums of 2008
- Triple J Hottest 100
- top 25 singles
- top 25 albums

These are the Australian Country number-one albums of 2008, per the ARIA Charts.

| Issue date | Album | Artist |
|---|---|---|
| 7 January | Long Road Out of Eden | Eagles |
| 14 January | Long Road Out of Eden | Eagles |
| 21 January | The Ultimate Hits | Garth Brooks |
| 28 January | Lost Highway | Bon Jovi |
| 4 February | Winners 2008 | Various Artists |
| 11 February | Winners 2008 | Various Artists |
| 18 February | Winners 2008 | Various Artists |
| 25 February | Winners 2008 | Various Artists |
| 3 March | The Ultimate Hits | Garth Brooks |
| 10 March | Reunion | The Slim Dusty Family |
| 17 March | Reunion | The Slim Dusty Family |
| 24 March | Reunion | The Slim Dusty Family |
| 31 March | Reunion | The Slim Dusty Family |
| 7 April | Reunion | The Slim Dusty Family |
| 14 April | So Country | Various artists |
| 21 April | Good Time | Alan Jackson |
| 28 April | Rattlin' Bones | Kasey Chambers & Shane Nicholson |
| 5 May | Rattlin' Bones | Kasey Chambers & Shane Nicholson |
| 12 May | Rattlin' Bones | Kasey Chambers & Shane Nicholson |
| 19 May | Rattlin' Bones | Kasey Chambers & Shane Nicholson |
| 26 May | Rattlin' Bones | Kasey Chambers & Shane Nicholson |
| 2 June | Rattlin' Bones | Kasey Chambers & Shane Nicholson |
| 9 June | Rattlin' Bones | Kasey Chambers & Shane Nicholson |
| 16 June | Rattlin' Bones | Kasey Chambers & Shane Nicholson |
| 23 June | Long Road Out of Eden | Eagles |
| 30 June | Rattlin' Bones | Kasey Chambers & Shane Nicholson |
| 7 July | Rattlin' Bones | Kasey Chambers & Shane Nicholson |
| 14 July | Rattlin' Bones | Kasey Chambers & Shane Nicholson |
| 21 July | Rattlin' Bones | Kasey Chambers & Shane Nicholson |
| 28 July | Life, Death, Love and Freedom | John Mellencamp |
| 4 August | Life, Death, Love and Freedom | John Mellencamp |
| 11 August | Bundy Country 2 | Various Artists |
| 18 August | Bundy Country 2 | Various Artists |
| 25 August | Hillbilly Road | John Williamson |
| 1 September | Hillbilly Road | John Williamson |
| 8 September | Hillbilly Road | John Williamson |
| 15 September | Hillbilly Road | John Williamson |
| 22 September | The Best of Country Music Channel 2008 | Various Artists |
| 29 September | The Best of Country Music Channel 2008 | Various Artists |
| 6 October | The Best of Country Music Channel 2008 | Various Artists |
| 13 October | Rattlin' Bones | Kasey Chambers & Shane Nicholson |
| 20 October | Little Honey | Lucinda Williams |
| 27 October | Rattlin' Bones | Kasey Chambers & Shane Nicholson |
| 3 November | 21 Number Ones | Kenny Rogers |
| 10 November | Country Boy | Daniel O'Donnell |
| 17 November | Rattlin' Bones | Kasey Chambers & Shane Nicholson |
| 24 November | Fearless | Taylor Swift |
| 1 December | Rattlin' Bones | Kasey Chambers & Shane Nicholson |
| 8 December | Christmas Duets | Elvis Presley |
| 15 December | Christmas Duets | Elvis Presley |
| 22 December | Christmas Duets | Elvis Presley |
| 29 December | Christmas Duets | Elvis Presley |

== See also ==
- 2008 in music
- List of number-one albums of 2008 (Australia)
