= Mechanical Bull (album) =

Studio album by Kings of Leon
- Released: September 20, 2013
- Recorded: 2013
- Studio: The Neon Leon (Nashville)
- Genres: Southern rock; blues rock; post-punk revival
- Length: 42:01
- Label: RCA
- Producer: Angelo Petraglia

Kings of Leon chronology
Come Around Sundown (2010)	Mechanical Bull (2013)	Walls (2016)

Alternative cover art
- Deluxe edition cover

Singles from Mechanical Bull
- 1. "Supersoaker" Released: July 17, 2013; 2. "Wait for Me" Released: August 6, 2013; 3. "Temple" Released: October 14, 2013; 4. "Beautiful War" Released: December 9, 2013; 5. "Don't Matter" Released: June 16, 2014; 6. "Family Tree" Released: June 17, 2014

Mechanical Bull is the sixth studio album by American rock band Kings of Leon. It was first released in Europe and Australia on September 20, 2013, in the United Kingdom on September 23, and the following day in North America, by RCA Records. It was nominated for Best Rock Album at the 56th Grammy Awards.

== Reception ==
Professional ratings
Aggregate scores
Source	Rating
AnyDecentMusic?	6.4/10
Metacritic	70/100
Review scores
Source	Rating
AllMusic	3.5/5 stars
The A.V. Club	B−
Entertainment Weekly	B+
The Guardian	4/5 stars
The Independent	3/5 stars
NME	6/10
Q	3/5 stars
Rolling Stone	3.5/5 stars
Spin	8/10
Uncut	9/10

Mechanical Bull received generally positive reviews from critics. At Metacritic, the album has a weighted averagescore of 70 out of 100 based on 30 reviews, indicating "generally favorable reviews".

The album debuted at No. 2 on the Billboard 200, based on 110,000 copies sold in its first week. It has sold 347,000 copies in the United States as of August 2016. In the United Kingdom, the album debuted at No. 1 on the Official Albums Chart, selling 71,000 copies in the first week. The album has sold 323,240 copies in the UK as of October 2016. Mechanical Bull is the first Kings of Leon album that sold more copies in the United States than in the UK.

== Promotion ==
The first single to promote the album, "Supersoaker", was released on July 17, 2013. This single was followed by the release of the second single titled "Wait for Me" on August 6, 2013. During the Heineken Open'er Festival 2013, Kings of Leon performed "Don't Matter", another song from this album. The third single "Temple" impacted US active rock and adult album alternative (triple A) radio on October 14, 2013 and modern rock radio on October 15, 2013. The band released the Official Video for "Beautiful War" on November 22, 2013. The song has been described by the Guardian as "a slow-grower about love and fighting," and a "distant cousin of U2's With or Without You". "Beautiful War" and "Don't Matter" were released as singles exclusively in the United Kingdom on December 9, 2013, and June 16, 2014, respectively. "Family Tree" was sent to US modern rock radio as the album's sixth overall single on June 17, 2014. An adult album alternative release followed on July 1, 2014.

To promote the album, on September 24, 2013, the band appeared on Good Morning America and performed "Supersoaker". They have also performed "Temple" on Jimmy Kimmel Live!, Late Night with Jimmy Fallon and Saturday Night Live.

=== Singles ===
"Supersoaker" reached to number 2 on the US Adult Alternative Songs chart and number 9 on the US Alternative chart. The song also peaked at number 1 on the Canada Rock chart.

"Wait for Me" reached to number 14 on the US Hot Rock Songs chart and number 10 on the US Adult Alternative Songs chart. Five days after being released in the UK, it debut at number 31 on the UK Singles Chart.

"Temple" peaked at number 1 on the Canada Rock chart.

== Track listing ==
All tracks are written by Caleb Followill, Nathan Followill, Jared Followill and Matthew Followill.

No.	Title	Length
1.	"Supersoaker"	3:50
2.	"Rock City"	2:56
3.	"Don't Matter"	2:50
4.	"Beautiful War"	5:09
5.	"Temple"	4:10
6.	"Wait for Me"	3:30
7.	"Family Tree"	3:50
8.	"Comeback Story"	3:59
9.	"Tonight"	4:33
10.	"Coming Back Again"	3:28
11.	"On the Chin"	3:46
Total length:		42:00

Deluxe edition
No.	Title	Length
12.	"Work On Me"	4:04
13.	"Last Mile Home"	4:11
Total length:		50:46

Saturn exclusive edition
No.	Title	Length
12.	"Work On Me"	4:04
13.	"Last Mile Home"	4:11
14.	"Molly's Chambers" (Live at the O2 Arena)
15.	"Sex on Fire" (Live at the O2 Arena)
16.	"On Call" (Live at the O2 Arena)
17.	"Use Somebody" (Live at the O2)

== Personnel ==
Kings of Leon

- Caleb Followill – lead vocals, rhythm guitar
- Matthew Followill – lead guitar, piano, lap steel guitar, sitar, vocals
- Jared Followill – bass guitar, synthesizer, vocals
- Nathan Followill – drums, percussion, vocals

Technical personnel

- Angelo Petraglia – producer
- Ted Jensen – Mastering engineer

== Charts and certifications ==
=== Weekly charts ===
Chart (2013)	Peak position
Australian Albums (ARIA)	1
Austrian Albums (Ö3 Austria)	2
Belgian Albums (Ultratop Flanders)	4
Belgian Albums (Ultratop Wallonia)	13
Canadian Albums (Billboard)	2
Czech Albums (ČNS IFPI)	24
Danish Albums (Hitlisten)	3
Dutch Albums (Album Top 100)	2
Finnish Albums (Suomen virallinen lista)	19
French Albums (SNEP)	37
German Albums (Offizielle Top 100)	2
Greek Albums (IFPI)	9
Irish Albums (IRMA)	1
Italian Albums (FIMI)	8
New Zealand Albums (RMNZ)	1
Norwegian Albums (VG-lista)	7
Polish Albums (ZPAV)	2
Portuguese Albums (AFP)	4
Scottish Albums (Official Charts)	1
Spanish Albums (Promusicae)	9
Swedish Albums (Sverigetopplistan)	21
Swiss Albums (Schweizer Hitparade)	2
UK Albums (Official Charts)	1
US Billboard 200	2
US Top Rock Albums (Billboard)	1
US Top Alternative Albums (Billboard)	1

=== Year-end charts ===
Chart (2013)	Position
Australian Albums (ARIA)	80
Austrian Albums (Ö3 Austria)	57
Belgian Albums (Ultratop Flanders)	71
Belgian Albums (Ultratop Wallonia)	177
Dutch Albums (Album Top 100)	51
German Albums (Offizielle Top 100)	97
Swiss Albums (Schweizer Hitparade)	85
UK Albums (OCC)	36
US Billboard 200	137
US Top Rock Albums (Billboard)	31
US Alternative Albums (Billboard)	22
Chart (2014)	Position
Belgian Albums (Ultratop Flanders)	124
UK Albums (OCC)	87
US Top Rock Albums (Billboard)	51
US Alternative Albums (Billboard)	39

=== Certifications ===
Region	Certification	Certified units/sales
Australia (ARIA)	Gold	35,000^{^}
Austria (IFPI Austria)	Gold	7,500^{*}
Canada (Music Canada)	Platinum	80,000^{‡}
Germany (BVMI)	Gold	100,000^{‡}
Ireland (IRMA)	Gold	7,500^{^}
Mexico (AMPROFON)	Gold	30,000^{‡}
New Zealand (RMNZ)	Platinum	15,000^{‡}
Poland (ZPAV)	Gold	10,000^{*}
Portugal (AFP)	Gold	7,500^{^}
United Kingdom (BPI)	Platinum	323,240
United States	—	347,000
^{*} Sales figures based on certification alone.^{^} Shipments figures based on certification alone.^{‡} Sales+streaming figures based on certification alone.

== Release history ==
Region	Date	Format	Label
Australia	September 20, 2013	CD, digital download	Sony Music Entertainment
Germany	September 20, 2013	CD, digital download	Sony Music Entertainment
Ireland	September 20, 2013	CD, digital download	Sony Music Entertainment
Sweden	September 20, 2013	CD, digital download	Sony Music Entertainment
United Kingdom	September 23, 2013	CD, digital download	RCA Records
United States	September 24, 2013	CD, digital download	RCA Records
