= Beautiful War =

Beautiful War may refer to:

- "Beautiful War" (song), a song by Kings of Leon on their 2013 album Mechanical Bull
- "Beautiful War", a song by The Gathering on their 2000 album if_then_else
