= Only by the Night =

Studio album by Kings of Leon
- Released: September 19, 2008
- Recorded: February – June 2008
- Studio: Blackbird (Berry Hill, Tennessee)
- Genres: Alternative rock; pop rock; Southern rock
- Length: 42:55
- Label: RCA
- Producers: Jacquire King; Angelo Petraglia

Kings of Leon chronology
Because of the Times (2007)	Only by the Night (2008)	Come Around Sundown (2010)

Alternative cover
- UK album cover

Singles from Only by the Night
- 1. "Sex on Fire" Released: August 11, 2008; 2. "Use Somebody" Released: December 8, 2008; 3. "Revelry" Released: March 2, 2009; 4. "Notion" Released: June 29, 2009; 5. "Crawl" Released: October 27, 2009; 6. "Frontier City" Released: January 1, 2010

"Use Somebody"
Kings of Leon's "Use Somebody" from Only by the Night

Only by the Night is the fourth studio album by American rock band Kings of Leon, released in September 2008 through RCA Records. Writing for the band's fourth album commenced just days after the release of their third, Because of the Times. The album was recorded by producers Jacquire King and Angelo Petraglia in April 2008 at Nashville's Blackbird Studio.

Only by the Night experienced commercial success, peaking inside the top 10 of over 10 countries. The album was certified the best-selling album in Australia, certified nine times platinum. It also went on to be the highest selling album of 2008 in Australia, the third best selling album of 2008 in the UK, winning two Brit Awards, and the 18th best-selling album of the 2000s in the UK. Furthermore, two singles from the album have found high chartings, "Sex on Fire" coming in at number one in Ireland, the UK, Australia, and on the United States' Hot Modern Rock Tracks, and at number two in New Zealand. The album's second single "Use Somebody" also charted at number two in the UK, and at number two in Australia, along with being the band's first top 10 hit in the U.S. The album was nominated for Best Rock Album at the 2009 Grammy Awards, with the song "Sex on Fire" receiving two nominations itself. Worldwide sales of the album exceed 6.2 million copies, according to a press release by the band.

"Sex on Fire" came in at number one on the Triple J Hottest 100, 2008, with "Use Somebody" number three, "Closer" number 24 and "Crawl" number 70.

== Production and recording history ==
In September 2007, lead singer Caleb Followill confirmed to NME that tracks were already being worked on for a fourth album, only a few days after the release of the band's third album, Because of the Times. Recording began in February 2008 in Nashville's Blackbird Studios with assistant engineer, Lowell Reynolds. According to producer Jacquire King, the live performances of the main parts of each song were recorded onto 16-track analog tape and later transferred to a Pro Tools system for overdubbing and mixing. On June 23, 2008, the release date of September 22, 2008 was set and the new title was announced.

== Release ==
"Crawl" was released via the band's website as a free download for a short time, although it was not the first proper single. The first single "Sex on Fire," was released September 15, 2008. The same day, music website Last.fm was the first to make the entire album available for streaming. The music video for "Sex on Fire" was later made available to stream on their website and YouTube channel. The song "Use Somebody" was announced as the second single and released in October 2008. The song was a massive hit, peaking at number 4 on the Billboard Hot 100 in the United States, number 2 in the United Kingdom, and performing well in Australia and several other countries. The third single from the album was "Revelry," released March 2, 2009.

"Notion" is the fourth single from the album. The video was released on June 1 and the song appeared on radio on June 29. The song was another success for the group, peaking at #1 on the Billboard Alternative Songs.

In Australia, the song "Manhattan" was released to radio as another single. The song spent four weeks on the singles chart and peaked at number 38 and reached number two on the National Airplay Chart. The song has also had heavy rotation on UK radio stations such as Xfm. Another fan favorite was the album's opening track "Closer," which features a three note riff by bass player Jared Followill that utilises a Boss ME50 multi-effects pedal to add a distinctive octave sweep reminiscent of the DigiTech Whammy.

== Critical reception ==
Professional ratings
Aggregate scores
Source	Rating
Metacritic	63/100
Review scores
Source	Rating
AllMusic	3/5 stars
The A.V. Club	B−
Entertainment Weekly	B+
The Guardian	3/5 stars
Los Angeles Times	2.5/4 stars
NME	7/10
Pitchfork	3.8/10
Q	4/5 stars
Rolling Stone	3/5 stars
Spin	4/5 stars

Metacritic, which uses a weighted average, assigned a score of 63/100 based on 30 critics, indicating "generally favorable" reviews. A discrepancy between ratings of the North American and the UK press can be noted. The U.S. online publications Pitchfork Media, PopMatters and JustPressPlay gave the album a 3.8/10, 2/10 and 4/10 respectively, while the album received ratings of 5/5 and 4.5/5 from the UK's The Observer and Virgin Media. Record sales showed it chasing Coldplay's Viva la Vida or Death and All His Friends for the fastest selling album of the year in Ireland and the UK.

=== Accolades ===
Only by the Night received a nomination for Best Rock Album at the 51st Grammy Awards with the single "Sex on Fire" receiving two nominations for Best Rock Performance by a Duo or Group with Vocal and Best Rock Song. "Sex on Fire" was awarded with the Grammy for Best Rock Performance by a Duo or Group with Vocals on February 8.

At the 52nd Grammy Awards the song "Use Somebody" won the Record of the Year, Best Rock Song and the Best Rock Performance by a Duo or Group with Vocal.

The album was also awarded "2008 Album of the Year" by the UK's Q Magazine, as well as Rolling Stone voting it as the 20th best album out of their top 50 Best Albums of 2008. The album was also awarded Best International Album at the BRIT Awards, the Meteors and the Juno Awards.

== Commercial performance ==
Only by the Night was a massive success in the United Kingdom. At the end of September 2008, the album entered the UK Albums Chart at number one, with first week sales of over 220,000 copies. In February 2009, it was announced that Only by the Night is currently the biggest selling digital album of all-time in the UK, surpassing Amy Winehouse's Back to Black. Sales for 2008, in which Only by the Night was the third biggest selling album of the year, were 1,181,640 and a similar level of 1,078,555 for 2009, when it became the fifth biggest selling album of the year. It sold a further 340,000 units in 2010 and was placed at number 31 on the year-end chart. As of March 27, 2011, Only by the Night has spent 131 consecutive weeks inside the Top 75. As of October 2016, it has sold 2,916,779 copies in the UK.

In the U.S., the album debuted at number five on the Billboard 200, but fell to 20 the following week. It then dropped as low as 78, but then gradually moved back up the chart. After 48 weeks on the chart, the album managed to outpeak its debut position, climbing to number four. It has also managed to achieve a 2× Platinum certification for shipping two million copies. In Canada, the album debuted at number four on the Canadian Albums Chart, eventually peaking at number two.

In Australia, the album has been certified 9× Platinum, selling over 630,000 copies. It re-entered the Australia charts at 43 in September 2010. The album was the highest selling album of 2008 in Australia. The album has also been a hit in New Zealand, spending over thirty consecutive weeks in the top ten, including nine non-consecutive weeks at number one. It finished 2008 as the second highest selling album and has been certified 5× Platinum by RIANZ.

In Germany, Only by the Night has spent 104 weeks on the country's Albums Chart making it the 50th album to spend two years or longer on that chart.

Worldwide sales of the album exceed 6.2 million copies, according to a press release by the band.

== Track listing ==
=== Original release ===
All lyrics are written by Caleb Followill; all music is composed by Caleb Followill, Nathan Followill, Jared Followill and Matthew Followill.

No.	Title	Length
1.	"Closer"	3:57
2.	"Crawl"	4:06
3.	"Sex on Fire"	3:23
4.	"Use Somebody"	3:51
5.	"Manhattan"	3:24
6.	"Revelry"	3:21
7.	"17"	3:05
8.	"Notion"	3:00
9.	"I Want You"	5:07
10.	"Be Somebody"	3:47
11.	"Cold Desert"	5:34
Total length:		42:55

=== Vinyl and iTunes editions ===
Bonus track
No.	Title	Length
12.	"Frontier City"	3:37

=== Japanese edition ===
Bonus tracks
No.	Title	Length
12.	"Beneath the Surface"	2:48
13.	"The Bucket" (CSS Remix)	3:44

=== Target bonus disc ===
Live from the Hammersmith Apollo 2007
No.	Title	Length
1.	"King of the Rodeo"	2:48
2.	"Slow Night, So Long"	3:09
3.	"Fans"	4:01
4.	"Molly's Chambers"	2:25
5.	"My Party"	4:01
6.	"Arizona"	4:48
7.	"Charmer"	3:34

=== Australian tour edition ===
Live in London DVD
No.	Title	Length
1.	"Use Somebody"
2.	"On Call"
3.	"Sex on Fire"
4.	"Crawl"
5.	"Manhattan"

== Personnel ==
Kings of Leon

- Caleb Followill – vocals, rhythm guitar
- Matthew Followill – lead guitar, vocals, keyboards on "Frontier City" and "Notion"
- Jared Followill – bass guitar, vocals
- Nathan Followill – drums, percussion, vocals

Additional personnel

- Angelo Petraglia – production, keyboards on "Revelry"
- Jacquire King – production, keyboards on "Use Somebody"
- Alex Fraser – triangle
- Lowell Reynolds – second engineer
- Ken Levitan & Andy Mendelsohn for Vector – management

== Charts ==
=== Weekly charts ===
Chart (2008–2010)	Peak position
Australian Albums (ARIA)	1
Austrian Albums (Ö3 Austria)	6
Belgian Albums (Ultratop Flanders)	1
Belgian Albums (Ultratop Wallonia)	29
Canadian Albums (Billboard)	2
Danish Albums (Hitlisten)	5
Dutch Albums (Album Top 100)	3
European Albums (Billboard)	2
Finnish Albums (Suomen virallinen lista)	6
French Albums (SNEP)	38
German Albums (Offizielle Top 100)	16
Hungarian Albums (MAHASZ)	38
Irish Albums (IRMA)	1
Italian Albums (FIMI)	51
Mexican Albums (Top 100 Mexico)	27
New Zealand Albums (RMNZ)	1
Norwegian Albums (VG-lista)	8
Scottish Albums (Official Charts)	1
Swedish Albums (Sverigetopplistan)	4
Swiss Albums (Schweizer Hitparade)	10
UK Albums (Official Charts)	1
US Billboard 200	4
US Top Alternative Albums (Billboard)	1
US Digital Albums (Billboard)	4
US Top Rock Albums (Billboard)	1

Chart (2017)	Peak position
Latvian Albums (LaIPA)	66

Chart (2026)	Peak position
German Rock & Metal Albums (Offizielle Top 100)	18
Norwegian Rock Albums (IFPI Norge)	17

=== Year-end charts ===
Chart (2008)	Position
Australian Albums (ARIA)	1
Belgian Albums (Ultratop Flanders)	29
Dutch Albums (Album Top 100)	64
European Albums (Billboard)	47
Irish Albums (IRMA)	1
New Zealand Albums (RMNZ)	2
UK Albums (OCC)	3
Worldwide Albums (IFPI)	21

Chart (2009)	Position
Australian Albums (ARIA)	7
Austrian Albums (Ö3 Austria)	37
Belgian Albums (Ultratop Flanders)	1
Belgian Albums (Ultratop Wallonia)	80
Canadian Albums (Billboard)	7
Danish Albums (Hitlisten)	17
Dutch Albums (Album Top 100)	10
European Albums (Billboard)	2
German Albums (Offizielle Top 100)	37
Irish Albums (IRMA)	12
New Zealand Albums (RMNZ)	8
Swedish Albums (Sverigetopplistan)	27
Swiss Albums (Schweizer Hitparade)	48
UK Albums (OCC)	5
US Billboard 200	11
US Top Rock Albums (Billboard)	3

Chart (2010)	Position
Austrian Albums (Ö3 Austria)	55
European Top 100 Albums (Billboard)	44
German Albums (Offizielle Top 100)	96
UK Albums (OCC)	31
US Billboard 200	50
US Top Rock Albums (Billboard)	12

Chart (2011)	Position
UK Albums (OCC)	92

Chart (2012)	Position
Belgian Midprice Albums (Ultratop Flanders)	29

Chart (2013)	Position
UK Albums (OCC)	178

=== Decade-end charts ===
Chart (2000–2009)	Position
Australian Albums (ARIA)	6
UK Albums (OCC)	18

Chart (2010–2019)	Position
UK Albums (OCC)	84

== Certifications ==
Region	Certification	Certified units/sales
Australia (ARIA)	11× Platinum	770,000^{‡}
Austria (IFPI Austria)	2× Platinum	40,000^{*}
Belgium (BRMA)	2× Platinum	60,000^{*}
Canada (Music Canada)	4× Platinum	320,000^{^}
Denmark (IFPI Danmark)	5× Platinum	100,000^{‡}
Finland (Musiikkituottajat)	Gold	12,344
GCC (IFPI Middle East)	Platinum	6,000^{*}
Germany (BVMI)	7× Gold	700,000^{‡}
Ireland (IRMA)	5× Platinum	75,000^{^}
Italy (FIMI)	Gold	25,000^{*}
Mexico (AMPROFON)	Platinum	80,000^{‡}
Netherlands (NVPI)	Platinum	60,000^{^}
New Zealand (RMNZ)	10× Platinum	150,000^{‡}
Poland (ZPAV)	4× Platinum	80,000^{‡}
South Africa (RISA)	Platinum	40,000^{*}
Sweden (GLF)	Gold	20,000^{^}
Switzerland (IFPI Switzerland)	Gold	15,000^{^}
United Kingdom (BPI)	10× Platinum	3,000,000^{‡}
United States (RIAA)	2× Platinum	2,000,000^{^}
Summaries
Europe (IFPI)	3× Platinum	3,000,000^{*}
^{*} Sales figures based on certification alone.^{^} Shipments figures based on certification alone.^{‡} Sales+streaming figures based on certification alone.

== Awards ==
Year	Nominee / work	Award	Result
2009	International Album	Brit Awards	Won
2009	Best Rock Album	Grammy Awards	Nominated
2009	Best International Album	Meteor Awards	Won
2009	Best Album	NME Awards	Won
2009	Choice Music: Album (Group)	Teen Choice Awards	Nominated
2010	Best International Album	Juno Awards	Won

== Release history ==
Country	Date	Label	Format	Catalogue #
Australia / Republic of Ireland	September 19, 2008	Sony / Sony BMG	CD, download	88697327122
United Kingdom	September 22, 2008	Columbia / RCA	CD, download	88697351992
United Kingdom	September 22, 2008	RCA Victor Europe	LP	732712
United States	September 23, 2008	RCA	CD, download	88697-32712-2
United States	September 23, 2008	Control	2xLP	40243
Brazil	October 24, 2008	Sony BMG	CD, download	886973271223

== See also ==
- List of best-selling albums in Australia
- List of best-selling albums of the 2000s (decade) in the United Kingdom
