= Waste a Moment (Kings of Leon song) =

Single by Kings of Leon

from the album Walls
- Released: September 9, 2016
- Recorded: 2015–16
- Genre: Alternative rock; indie rock
- Length: 3:03
- Label: RCA
- Songwriters: Caleb Followill; Nathan Followill; Jared Followill; Matthew Followill

Kings of Leon singles chronology
"Family Tree" (2014)	"Waste a Moment" (2016)	"Reverend" (2017)

Music video
- "Waste a Moment" on YouTube

"Waste a Moment" is a song by American rock band Kings of Leon. The song was released as a digital download on September 9, 2016 through RCA Records as the lead single from their seventh studio album Walls (2016). The song was written by Caleb Followill, Nathan Followill, Jared Followill and Matthew Followill.

== Music video ==
A music video to accompany the release of "Waste a Moment" was first released onto YouTube on September 13, 2016.

== Commercial performance ==
"Waste a Moment" is the band's fifth single (and their first since 2010's "Radioactive") to reach number one on Billboard's Alternative Songs chart, charting for a total of 27 weeks. "Waste a Moment" also tied the record for the second longest #1 Adult Alternative Songs on the Billboard charts alongside Clocks by remaining at number one for fifteen non-consecutive weeks. It has also become the band's highest-charting single on the Mainstream Rock Songs chart, peaking at number 15, besting "Supersoaker"'s number 22 showing in 2013.

== Track listing ==
Digital download
No.	Title	Length
1.	"Waste a Moment"	3:03

== Charts ==
=== Weekly charts ===
Weekly chart performance for "Waste a Moment"
Chart (2016)	Peak position
Austria (Ö3 Austria Top 40)	56
Belgium (Ultratop 50 Flanders)	11
Belgium (Ultratip Bubbling Under Wallonia)	27
Canada Hot 100 (Billboard)	72
Canada Rock (Billboard)	1
Czech Republic Modern Rock (IFPI)	4
Germany (GfK)	95
Hungary (Rádiós Top 40)	24
Ireland (IRMA)	44
Mexico Ingles Airplay (Billboard)	11
Scottish Singles Sales (Official Charts)	14
Slovenia (SloTop50)	31
Switzerland (Schweizer Hitparade)	57
UK Singles (Official Charts)	45
US Bubbling Under Hot 100 (Billboard)	2
US Hot Rock & Alternative Songs (Billboard)	7
US Rock & Alternative Airplay (Billboard)	1

=== Year-end charts ===
Year-end chart performance for "Waste a Moment"
Chart (2016)	Position
Belgium (Ultratop Flanders)	77
US Hot Rock & Alternative Songs (Billboard)	50
US Rock Airplay (Billboard)	33

Chart (2017)	Position
US Hot Rock & Alternative Songs (Billboard)	37
US Rock Airplay (Billboard)	6

== Certifications ==
Certifications for "Waste a Moment"
Region	Certification	Certified units/sales
Mexico (AMPROFON)	Gold	30,000^{‡}
New Zealand (RMNZ)	Platinum	30,000^{‡}
United Kingdom (BPI)	Platinum	600,000^{‡}
^{‡} Sales+streaming figures based on certification alone.
