= Hope (Jack Johnson song) =

Single by Jack Johnson

from the album Sleep Through the Static
- Released: May 2008
- Recorded: Los Angeles, California, 2007
- Genre: Acoustic rock, reggae
- Length: 3:42
- Label: Universal, Columbia
- Songwriter(s): Jack Johnson, Zach Rogue
- Producer(s): J.P. Plunier

Jack Johnson singles chronology
"Same Girl" (2008)	"Hope" (2008)	"Go On" (2008)

"Hope" is the second official single from American musician Jack Johnson's album Sleep Through the Static. It was released in May 2008 as a digital download.

== Music video ==
=== First version ===
The first version of the video was released in May 2008 and consists only of Johnson performing the song with his band in the studio (similar to the "If I Had Eyes" video).

=== Second version ===
The second version was shown on many music channels in December 2008 and was directed by Stephen Hopkins.

The video was taped during one of Johnson's live performances in the "Sleep Through the Static Tour". It starts with a clip of the singer taking the stage with his backing band and as the song flows, the audience in the venue begins to dance slowly with music. At some points, the video shows scenes from Johnson's previous life as a fervent surfer before finally jumping into the musical industry.
