= Walls (Kings of Leon song) =

Promotional single by Kings of Leon

from the album Walls
- Released: September 22, 2016
- Recorded: 2015–16
- Studio: Henson (Hollywood, California)
- Genre: Folk rock; southern rock
- Length: 5:29
- Label: RCA
- Songwriters: Caleb Followill; Nathan Followill; Jared Followill; Matthew Followill
- Producer: Markus Dravs

Music video
- "Walls" on YouTube

"Walls" is a song by American rock band Kings of Leon, written by the band members Caleb, Nathan, Jared and Matthew Followill. It was released as a digital download on September 22, 2016, through RCA Records as the first promotional single from the band's seventh studio album, Walls (2016).

== Music video ==
A music video to accompany the release of "Walls" was first released onto YouTube on September 22, 2016, at a total length of five minutes and 28 seconds.

== Charts ==
Chart (2016–2017)	Peak position
Australia (ARIA)	95
Belgium (Ultratip Bubbling Under Flanders)	39
New Zealand Heatseekers (RMNZ)	3
Scottish Singles Sales (Official Charts)	30
UK Singles (Official Charts)	97
US Hot Rock & Alternative Songs (Billboard)	11

== Certifications ==
Region	Certification	Certified units/sales
United Kingdom (BPI)	Silver	200,000^{‡}
^{‡} Sales+streaming figures based on certification alone.

== Release history ==
Region	Date	Format	Label
United Kingdom	September 22, 2016	Digital download	RCA Records
