= Revelry (song) =

Single by Kings of Leon

from the album Only by the Night
- B-side: "Pistol of Fire" (Mark Ronson remix)
- Released: March 2, 2009
- Recorded: 2008
- Genre: Rock
- Length: 3:21
- Label: RCA; Sony
- Songwriters: Caleb Followill; Nathan Followill; Jared Followill; Matthew Followill
- Producers: Angelo Petraglia; Jacquire King

Kings of Leon singles chronology
"Use Somebody" (2008)	"Revelry" (2009)	"Notion" (2009)

"Revelry" is the third single from American rock band Kings of Leon's 2008 fourth studio album Only by the Night, released on March 2, 2009. The single debuted on the UK Singles Chart at No. 55 via download sales alone on March 1, 2009, and peaked at No. 29 the following week. It dropped only two places to No. 31 during its second physical week. It has marked the band's ninth UK top 40 single. The single is backed by a remix of "Pistol of Fire" by English DJ and producer Mark Ronson, originally a deep cut from the band's 2004 album Aha Shake Heartbreak, of which Ronson previously covered with vocals by singer D. Smith as the B-side to his cover of the Kaiser Chiefs' "Oh My God" featuring Lily Allen, from his 2007 studio album of cover versions Version. Ronson and Smith's rendition of "Pistol of Fire" also appears as one of three bonus tracks on the digital deluxe edition of Version.

== Track listing ==
1. "Revelry" – 3:21
2. "Pistol of Fire" (Mark Ronson remix) – 3:17

== Charts ==
Chart (2008–2009)	Peak position
Australia (ARIA)	21
Belgium (Ultratip Bubbling Under Flanders)	19
Mexico Ingles Airplay (Billboard)	28
New Zealand (Recorded Music NZ)	19
UK Singles (OCC)	29

== Certifications ==
Region	Certification	Certified units/sales
Australia (ARIA)	Gold	35,000^{^}
United Kingdom (BPI)	Gold	400,000^{‡}
^{^} Shipments figures based on certification alone.^{‡} Sales+streaming figures based on certification alone.
