= Family Tree (Kings of Leon song) =

Single by Kings of Leon

from the album Mechanical Bull
- Released: June 17, 2014
- Recorded: 2013
- Genre: Blues rock; southern rock; garage rock
- Length: 3:50
- Label: RCA Records
- Songwriters: Caleb Followill; Nathan Followill; Jared Followill; Matthew Followill

Kings of Leon singles chronology
"Don't Matter" (2014)	"Family Tree" (2014)	"Waste a Moment" (2016)

"Family Tree" is a song by American rock band Kings of Leon. The song was released as a digital download on June 17, 2014 through RCA Records as the sixth and final single from their sixth studio album Mechanical Bull (2013). The song was written by Caleb Followill, Nathan Followill, Jared Followill and Matthew Followill.

== Track listing ==
Digital download
No.	Title	Length
1.	"Family Tree"	3:50

== Personnel ==
- Caleb Followill - lead vocals, rhythm guitar
- Nathan Followill - drums, backing vocals
- Matthew Followill - lead guitar
- Jared Followill - bass
- Angelo Petraglia - electric Wurlitzer piano, backing vocals

== Chart performance ==
=== Weekly charts ===
Chart (2014)	Peak position
US Alternative Airplay (Billboard)	33
