= Don't Matter (Kings of Leon song) =

Single by Kings of Leon

from the album Mechanical Bull
- Released: June 16, 2014
- Recorded: 2013
- Genre: Southern rock; blues rock; garage rock; alternative rock
- Length: 2:50
- Label: RCA Records
- Songwriters: Caleb Followill; Nathan Followill; Jared Followill; Matthew Followill

Kings of Leon singles chronology
"Beautiful War" (2014)	"Don't Matter" (2014)	"Family Tree" (2014)

"Don't Matter" is a song by American rock band Kings of Leon. The song was released as a digital download on June 16, 2014, through RCA Records as the fifth single from their sixth studio album Mechanical Bull (2013). The song was written by Caleb Followill, Nathan Followill, Jared Followill and Matthew Followill.

== Track listing ==
Digital download
No.	Title	Length
1.	"Don't Matter"	2:50

== Chart performance ==
=== Weekly charts ===
Chart (2014)	Peak position
UK Singles (Official Charts)	174
