= Walls (Kings of Leon album) =

Studio album by Kings of Leon
- Released: October 14, 2016
- Recorded: 2015–2016
- Studios: Henson, Hollywood
- Genre: Indie rock
- Length: 42:42
- Label: RCA
- Producer: Markus Dravs

Kings of Leon chronology
Mechanical Bull (2013)	Walls (2016)	When You See Yourself (2021)

Singles from Walls
- 1. "Waste a Moment" Released: September 9, 2016; 2. "Reverend" Released: February 7, 2017; 3. "Around the World" Released: September 19, 2017

Walls (stylized as WALLS, an acronym for We Are Like Love Songs) is the seventh studio album by American rock band Kings of Leon, released on October 14, 2016, through RCA Records.

== Background ==
Following a New Year's Eve show in Nashville, Nathan Followill said the band was aiming to release album seven in 2016: "We've already started pre-production in our studio for the next record, but the main thing on the calendar for 2016 is getting the record finished. And then the whole press machine kicks up and doing press for the record." Caleb Followill added, "We enjoy this part of the process. Obviously there's a lot of work that goes into it and it can get stressful at times, but we're all in a good place and we're having fun with it and we're all excited to do something new." The album was recorded at Henson Studios in Los Angeles, with Caleb saying the band was looking for inspiration: "We might just try to get a little change of scenery. Our first two albums we recorded in L.A., so we're going to try to go back and see if it inspires us," he said. "If it doesn't, we always have a studio at home, so we can always come back."

In August, the band announced that album title would be We Are Like Love Songs (aka WALLS), and that it would be released on October 14, 2016.

== Promotion ==
On September 10, 2016, Kings of Leon headlined at the Saturday evening Lollapalooza Europe music festival, in Berlin, Germany, which featured songs from all their albums, plus the new "Waste a Moment". Kings of Leon performed "Waste a Moment" on Today and The Tonight Show Starring Jimmy Fallon on October 14, 2016.

The Walls Tour began on January 12, 2017.

On January 18, 2017, Kings of Leon performed "Reverend" on The Tonight Show Starring Jimmy Fallon.

=== Singles ===
The album's lead single, "Waste a Moment", was released on September 9, 2016. The song peaked at number one on Billboard's Alternative Songs chart, their first chart topper since 2010.

Kings of Leon released an official video for the track "Find Me" in December 2016 which acted as a companion clip to their video for single ‘Waste a Moment'.

The second official single, "Reverend", was sent to alternative radio on February 7, 2017. It was previously released as the album's third promotional single on October 6, 2016.

The third official single, "Around the World", was sent to alternative radio on September 19, 2017. It was previously released as the album's second promotional single on September 29, 2016.

== Critical reception ==
Professional ratings
Aggregate scores
Source	Rating
AnyDecentMusic?	5.4/10
Metacritic	62/100
Review scores
Source	Rating
AllMusic	4/5 stars
The Daily Telegraph	3/5 stars
Entertainment Weekly	B+
The Guardian	3/5 stars
The Independent	2/5 stars
NME	4/5 stars
The Observer	3/5 stars
Pitchfork	4.5/10
Q	3/5 stars
Rolling Stone	3/5 stars

Metacritic, which uses a weighted average, assigned a score of 62 out of 100 based on 23 critics, indicating "generally favorable reviews". Dave Simpson of The Guardian said that with the album, the band returned to its sound from eight years ago. Rolling Stone's Will Hermes admired producer Markus Dravs's "job of translating Followill's signature sound slurred delivery and the band's muscular jangle into thicker arrangements, though the rest feel generic."

=== Accolades ===
Publication	Accolade	Rank	Ref.
NME	NME's Albums of the Year 2016	32	

== Commercial performance ==
Walls debuted at number one on the Billboard 200 with 77,000 album-equivalent units, of which 68,000 were traditional album sales. The next week, the album fell from number one to 20, making it the 10th largest drop from number one on the Billboard 200 as of December 2016. It was the biggest drop of the year until Bon Jovi released This House Is Not for Sale in November 2016. It is Kings of Leon's first number one album in the US, besting the number two peak of Mechanical Bull and Come Around Sundown. It also debuted at number one in Ireland, New Zealand, and the UK.

== Track listing ==
All tracks are written by Caleb Followill, Nathan Followill, Jared Followill and Matthew Followill.

No.	Title	Length
1.	"Waste a Moment"	3:03
2.	"Reverend"	3:54
3.	"Around the World"	3:34
4.	"Find Me"	4:05
5.	"Over"	6:10
6.	"Muchacho"	3:09
7.	"Conversation Piece"	4:59
8.	"Eyes on You"	4:40
9.	"Wild"	3:39
10.	"Walls"	5:29
Total length:		42:42

== Personnel ==
Kings of Leon

- Caleb Followill – lead and backing vocals, guitar, percussion
- Matthew Followill – backing vocals, guitar, percussion
- Jared Followill – backing vocals, bass guitar, percussion
- Nathan Followill – backing vocals, drums, percussion

Additional musicians

- Liam O'Neil – background vocals, Clavinet, Jupiter-8, Mellotron, Minimoog, percussion, piano, prophet synthesizer, synthesizer, Wurlitzer

Production

- Robin Baynton – engineer
- Anthony Cairns – assistant
- Markus Dravs – producer
- Nicolas Essig – assistant engineer
- Christopher Followill – assistant
- Michael Freeman – mixing assistant
- Britti Himelfarb – assistant
- Ted Jensen – mastering
- Dylan Nelson – assistant engineer
- Brent Rawlings – assistant
- Mitch Sallee – assistant
- Jay Schleusener – assistant
- Spike Stent – mixing
- Geoff Swan – mixing assistant
- Jessica Windsor – assistant

== Charts ==
=== Weekly charts ===
Chart (2016)	Peak position
Australian Albums (ARIA)	3
Austrian Albums (Ö3 Austria)	1
Belgian Albums (Ultratop Flanders)	2
Belgian Albums (Ultratop Wallonia)	8
Canadian Albums (Billboard)	1
Croatian International Albums (HDU)	5
Danish Albums (Hitlisten)	9
Dutch Albums (Album Top 100)	2
Finnish Albums (Suomen virallinen lista)	22
French Albums (SNEP)	38
German Albums (Offizielle Top 100)	2
Greek Albums (IFPI)	32
Hungarian Albums (MAHASZ)	33
Irish Albums (IRMA)	1
Italian Albums (FIMI)	14
New Zealand Albums (RMNZ)	1
Norwegian Albums (VG-lista)	8
Polish Albums (ZPAV)	4
Scottish Albums (Official Charts)	1
Spanish Albums (PROMUSICAE)	9
Swedish Albums (Sverigetopplistan)	3
Swiss Albums (Schweizer Hitparade)	2
UK Albums (Official Charts)	1
US Billboard 200	1
US Top Rock Albums (Billboard)	1

=== Year-end charts ===
Chart (2016)	Position
Belgian Albums (Ultratop Flanders)	60
Belgian Albums (Ultratop Wallonia)	151
Dutch Albums (MegaCharts)	79
UK Albums (OCC)	36
US Top Rock Albums (Billboard)	32

Chart (2017)	Position
Belgian Albums (Ultratop Flanders)	132
US Top Rock Albums (Billboard)	80

== Certifications ==
Certifications for Walls
Region	Certification	Certified units/sales
Canada (Music Canada)	Gold	40,000^{‡}
Mexico (AMPROFON)	Gold	30,000^{‡}
New Zealand (RMNZ)	Platinum	15,000^{‡}
Poland (ZPAV)	Platinum	20,000^{‡}
United Kingdom (BPI)	Platinum	300,000^{‡}
^{‡} Sales+streaming figures based on certification alone.
