= Fans (song) =

Single by Kings of Leon

from the album Because of the Times
- B-side: "Woo Hoo"
- Released: July 9, 2007
- Genre: Southern rock
- Length: 3:36
- Label: Columbia
- Songwriters: Kings of Leon (Caleb Followill, Matthew Followill. Jared Followill, Nathan Followill)
- Producers: Ethan Johns; Angelo Petraglia

Kings of Leon singles chronology
| "On Call" (2007) | "Fans" (2007) | "Charmer" (2007) |

"Fans" is a song by American rock band Kings of Leon. It is the second single released from their 2007 album, Because of the Times, and the ninth track on the album. Lyrically, the song pays homage to the band's fans in the UK, where the band have traditionally enjoyed more success than in their homeland: "All of London sing / 'Cos England swings and they sure love the tales I bring".

Musically, the song features a combination of both electric and acoustic guitars, with a pounding bass line reminiscent of that of the Styx song "I'm O.K." The song was released as a single on July 9, 2007. It was the band's highest-charting single at the time, reaching number 13 on the UK Singles Chart ("Sex on Fire" would reach the number one position in September 2008). The single peaked at number 13 on the Irish Singles Chart.

== Track listing ==
CD / 7" vinyl:

1. "Fans" – 3:36
2. "Woo Hoo" – 3:31

== Charts ==
=== Weekly charts ===
| Chart (2007–2008) | Peak position |
|---|---|
| Belgium (Ultratip Bubbling Under Flanders) | 13 |
| Ireland (IRMA) | 13 |
| New Zealand (Recorded Music NZ) | 23 |
| UK Singles (Official Charts Company) | 13 |

=== Year-end charts ===
| Chart (2007) | Position |
|---|---|
| UK Singles (Official Charts Company) | 196 |

== Certifications ==
| Region | Certification | Certified units/sales |
|---|---|---|
| United Kingdom (BPI) | Gold | 400,000^{‡} |
^{‡} Sales+streaming figures based on certification alone.
