= List of top 25 albums for 2008 in Australia =

Top 25 albums of 2008 < 2007 2009 >

Other Australian top charts for 2008
- top 25 singles
- Triple J Hottest 100

Australian number-one charts of 2008
- albums
- singles
- urban singles
- dance singles
- club tracks
- digital tracks

These are the top 25 albums of 2008 in Australia from the Australian Recording Industry Association (ARIA) End of Year Albums Chart.

| # | Title | Artist | Highest pos. reached | Weeks at No. 1 |
|---|---|---|---|---|
| 1. | Only by the Night | Kings of Leon | 1 | 14 (Note: Only by the Night debuted at #4 on the ARIA Top 50 in September 2008 and peaked at #1 in October for four weeks, it peaked at #1 in January–February 2009 for six weeks and again in March–April for four weeks. As of November 2009, it has continuously remained in the Top 50 for a total of 59 weeks.) |
| 2. | Funhouse | Pink | 1 | 9 |
| 3. | Black Ice | AC/DC | 1 | 1 |
| 4. | Viva la Vida or Death and All His Friends | Coldplay | 1 | 4 |
| 5. | Apocalypso | The Presets | 1 | 1 |
| 6. | Mamma Mia! The Movie Soundtrack | Soundtrack | 1 | 5 |
| 7. | Exclusive | Chris Brown | 5 | |
| 8. | Death Magnetic | Metallica | 1 | 1 |
| 9. | Good Girl Gone Bad | Rihanna | 2 | |
| 10. | We Sing. We Dance. We Steal Things. | Jason Mraz | 3 | |
| 11. | Sleep Through the Static | Jack Johnson | 1 | 6 |
| 12. | The Fame | Lady Gaga | 4 | |
| 13. | Lessons to Be Learned | Gabriella Cilmi | 2 | |
| 14. | Spirit | Leona Lewis | 1 | 1 |
| 15. | Dark Horse | Nickelback | 3 | |
| 16. | Oracular Spectacular | MGMT | 6 | |
| 17. | Hook Me Up | The Veronicas | 2 | |
| 18. | High School Musical 3: Senior Year | Soundtrack | 4 | |
| 19. | Breakout | Miley Cyrus | 1 | 1 |
| 20. | Waltzing Matilda | André Rieu and Mirusia | 1 | 2 |
| 21. | Gurrumul | Geoffrey Gurrumul Yunupingu | 3 | |
| 22. | Unessential Listening | Hamish & Andy | 4 | |
| 23. | The Promise | Il Divo | 5 | |
| 24. | Back to Black | Amy Winehouse | 4 | |
| 25. | Circus | Britney Spears | 3 | |

Peak chart positions for 2008 are from the ARIA Charts, overall position on the End of Year Chart is calculated by ARIA based on the number of weeks and position that the records reach within the Top 100 albums for each week during 2008.
