= Reverend (song) =

Single by Kings of Leon

from the album Walls
- Released: February 7, 2017
- Recorded: 2015–2016
- Genre: Indie rock
- Length: 3:54
- Label: RCA
- Songwriters: Caleb Followill; Nathan Followill; Jared Followill; Matthew Followill

Kings of Leon singles chronology
| "Waste a Moment" (2016) | "Reverend" (2017) | "Around the World" (2017) |

Music video
- "Reverend" on YouTube

"Reverend" is a song by American rock band Kings of Leon. The song was released as a promotional single on October 6, 2016 through RCA Records from their seventh studio album Walls (2016). It was later sent to alternative radio as the album's second official single on February 17, 2017. The song was written by bandmembers Caleb Followill, Nathan Followill, Jared Followill and Matthew Followill as a tribute to deceased country music singer-songwriter Blaze Foley.

== Music video ==
A music video to accompany the release of "Reverend" was released on February 10, 2017.

== Track listing ==
Digital download
| No. | Title | Length |
|---|---|---|
| 1. | "Reverend" | 3:54 |

== Charts ==
=== Weekly charts ===
| Chart (2016–17) | Peak position |
|---|---|
| Ireland (IRMA) | 91 |
| UK Singles (Official Charts) | 87 |
| Switzerland Airplay (Schweizer Hitparade) | 83 |
| US Hot Rock & Alternative Songs (Billboard) | 20 |
| US Adult Alternative Airplay (Billboard) | 3 |
| US Alternative Airplay (Billboard) | 9 |
| US Rock & Alternative Airplay (Billboard) | 10 |

=== Year-end charts ===
| Chart (2017) | Position |
|---|---|
| US Adult Alternative Songs (Billboard) | 9 |
| US Alternative Songs (Billboard) | 30 |
| US Hot Rock Songs (Billboard) | 87 |
| US Rock Airplay Songs (Billboard) | 38 |
