= Because of the Times =

Studio album by Kings of Leon
- Released: April 2, 2007
- Recorded: 2006
- Studios: Blackbird (Berry Hill, Tennessee); Sunset Sound (Hollywood, California)
- Genres: Alternative rock; Southern rock; garage rock revival; post-punk revival; pop rock; progressive rock
- Length: 51:33
- Label: RCA
- Producers: Ethan Johns; Angelo Petraglia

Kings of Leon chronology
Day Old Belgian Blues (2006)	Because of the Times (2007)	Only by the Night (2008)

Singles from Because of the Times
- 1. "On Call" Released: March 26, 2007; 2. "Fans" Released: July 9, 2007; 3. "Charmer" Released: October 29, 2007

Alternate cover
- United Kingdom editions

Because of the Times is the third studio album by American rock band Kings of Leon. It was released on April 2, 2007, in the United Kingdom and the next day in the United States. The album received generally positive reviews and appeared in numerous Top-10 lists for "Album of the Year". In 2009, Clash named the album number 3 on the "Clash Essential 50", a list of the most important albums released since the magazine's inception in 2004.

== Reception ==
Professional ratings
Aggregate scores
Source	Rating
Metacritic	79/100
Review scores
Source	Rating
AllMusic	3/5 stars
The A.V. Club	A−
Entertainment Weekly	A−
The Guardian	4/5 stars
The Independent	5/5 stars
NME	8/10
Pitchfork	5.4/10
Q	4/5 stars
Rolling Stone	4/5 stars
Spin	2.5/5 stars

Writing for NME, Barry Nicolson said the album "cements Kings Of Leon as one of the great American bands of our times". Entertainment Weekly called Because of the Times "an epic wide-screen movie of a CD and the band's best to date." Another reviewer described Because of the Times as "an accomplished album of unbelievable beauty and familiar, loveable grit. Kings of Leon is maturing wonderfully and with patience, not forcing anything musically or lyrically that doesn't sound natural."

Some critics found the album inferior to the band's previous efforts. Dave Hood of Artrocker gave the album one star out of five, finding that "Kings of Leon are experimenting, learning, and getting a bit lost." Pitchfork contended that "Because of the Times sound[s] suspiciously like a counterattack on womankind, launched from somewhere in the mid-1990s, deep inside a bruised, stadium-sized ego."

The album was ranked No. 6 on NME's list of the best albums of the year and No. 31 on Rolling Stone's Top 50 Albums of 2007 list.

== Track listing ==
All tracks are written by Kings of Leon.

No.	Title	Length
1.	"Knocked Up"	7:10
2.	"Charmer"	2:56
3.	"On Call"	3:21
4.	"McFearless"	3:09
5.	"Black Thumbnail"	4:00
6.	"My Party"	4:10
7.	"True Love Way"	4:02
8.	"Ragoo"	3:00
9.	"Fans"	3:35
10.	"The Runner"	4:16
11.	"Trunk"	3:57
12.	"Camaro"	3:09
13.	"Arizona"	4:50
Total length:		51:33

US iTunes, Japanese and deluxe edition bonus track
No.	Title	Length
14.	"My Third House"	4:03

UK iTunes bonus track
No.	Title	Length
14.	"On Call" (AOL Music Sessions)	3:21

== Personnel ==
- Caleb Followill – guitar, vocals
- Matthew Followill – guitar, backing vocals
- Jared Followill – bass guitar, backing vocals
- Nathan Followill – drums, backing vocals

== Charts and certifications ==
=== Weekly charts ===
Chart (2007)	Peak position
Australian Albums (ARIA)	4
Austrian Albums (Ö3 Austria)	35
Belgian Albums (Ultratop Flanders)	20
Danish Albums (Hitlisten)	39
Dutch Albums (Album Top 100)	62
European Albums (Billboard)	7
French Albums (SNEP)	88
German Albums (Offizielle Top 100)	32
Irish Albums (IRMA)	1
New Zealand Albums (RMNZ)	1
Scottish Albums (Official Charts)	2
Swiss Albums (Schweizer Hitparade)	86
UK Albums (Official Charts)	1
US Billboard 200	25
US Top Rock Albums (Billboard)	4

=== Year-end charts ===
Chart (2007)	Position
Australian Albums (ARIA)	46
Belgian Albums (Ultratop Flanders)	99
European Albums (Billboard)	76
Irish Albums (IRMA)	12
New Zealand Albums (RMNZ)	25
UK Albums (OCC)	31

Chart (2008)	Position
Australian Albums (ARIA)	46
UK Albums (OCC)	66

Chart (2009)	Position
Australian Albums (ARIA)	83
UK Albums (OCC)	90

== Certifications ==
Certifications for Because of the Times
Region	Certification	Certified units/sales
Australia (ARIA)	2× Platinum	140,000^{^}
Belgium (BRMA)	Gold	25,000^{*}
Germany (BVMI)	Gold	100,000^{^}
Ireland (IRMA)	3× Platinum	45,000^{^}
New Zealand (RMNZ)	2× Platinum	30,000^{‡}
United Kingdom (BPI)	3× Platinum	900,000^{‡}
United States	—	226,000
^{*} Sales figures based on certification alone.^{^} Shipments figures based on certification alone.^{‡} Sales+streaming figures based on certification alone.
