= List of number-one albums of 2008 (Australia) =

ARIA Charts number-one albums of 2008 < 2007 2009 >

Other Australian number-one charts of 2008
- singles
- urban singles
- dance singles
- club tracks
- digital tracks

Top Australian singles and albums of 2008
- Triple J Hottest 100
- top 25 singles
- top 25 albums

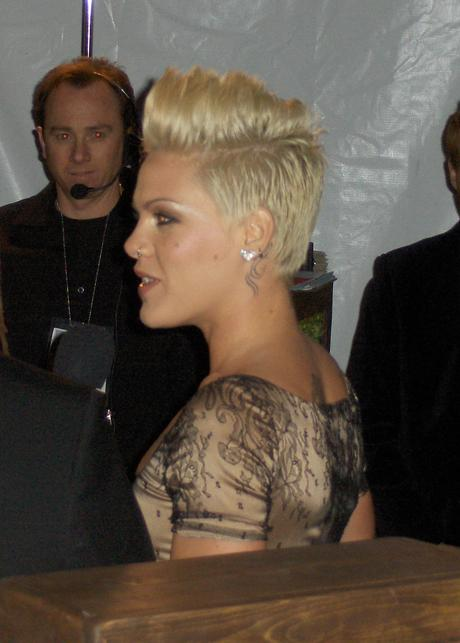
Pink, whose album Funhouse was the second highest seller of 2008

The highest-selling albums in Australia are ranked in the Australian Recording Industry Association albums chart, also known as the ARIA Charts, published by the Australian Recording Industry Association (ARIA). The data are compiled from a sample that includes music stores, music departments at electronics and department stores and Internet sales, in other words, both digital as well as CD sales. ARIA also issues a weekly singles chart and an end of year albums and singles chart, among other charts.

Alternative rock band Kings of Leon's Only by the Night had the longest non-consecutive run among the releases that have reached peak position in 2008; it spent 14 non-consecutive weeks atop the chart, beginning with the week of 29 September and continuing into the 2009 chart year. Funhouse by Pink, which spent nine weeks at number one, had the longest consecutive run at number one. Other albums with extended chart runs include Sleep Through the Static by Jack Johnson, which spent six weeks at number one, Timbaland Presents Shock Value by Timbaland and Mamma Mia! The Movie Soundtrack Featuring the Songs of ABBA by the cast of the film Mamma Mia!, both of which spent five weeks at number one.

Only by the Night is also the best-selling album of 2008; 422,108 copies have been sold, exceeding the second best-selling album of the year, pop singer Pink's Funhouse, by 3,000 copies. Apocalypso by The Presets spent one week atop the chart on 21 April, and won the ARIA awards for Album of the Year and Best Dance release.

Key
The yellow background indicates the #1 album on ARIA's End of Year Albums Chart of 2008.

== Chart history ==
Issue date of chart	Album	Artist	Weeks at number one (total)	Ref.
7 January 14 January 21 January 28 January	Timbaland Presents Shock Value	Timbaland	5	
4 February	Spirit	Leona Lewis	1	
11 February 18 February 25 February 3 March 10 March	Sleep Through the Static	Jack Johnson	6	
17 March	Breed Obsession	Gyroscope	1	
24 March	Sleep Through the Static	Jack Johnson	6	
31 March	In Ghost Colours	Cut Copy	1	
7 April	Pretty. Odd.	Panic! at the Disco	1	
14 April	Watershed	k.d. lang	1	
21 April	Apocalypso	The Presets	1	
28 April	Rattlin' Bones	Kasey Chambers and Shane Nicholson	1	
5 May	Hard Candy	Madonna	1	
12 May 19 May	Waltzing Matilda	André Rieu and Mirusia	2	
26 May	Summer at Eureka	Pete Murray	1	
2 June 9 June	Here I Stand	Usher	2	
16 June	Indestructible	Disturbed	1	
23 June 30 June 7 July 14 July	Viva la Vida or Death and All His Friends	Coldplay	4	
21 July 28 July 4 August 11 August 18 August	Mamma Mia! The Movie Soundtrack Featuring the Songs of ABBA	Mamma Mia! film cast	5	
25 August	2	Sneaky Sound System	1	
1 September 9 September	All Hope Is Gone	Slipknot	2	
15 September	Breakout	Miley Cyrus	1	
22 September	Death Magnetic	Metallica	1	
29 September 6 October 13 October 20 October	Only by the Night	Kings of Leon	14	
27 October	Black Ice	AC/DC	1	
3 November 10 November 17 November 24 November 1 December 8 December 15 December 22 December 29 December	Funhouse	Pink	9	

== See also ==
- 2008 in music
- List of number-one singles in Australia in 2008
- List of Top 25 albums for 2008 in Australia
