= Sleep Through the Static (song) =

Single by Jack Johnson

from the album Sleep Through the Static
- Released: December 2007
- Recorded: Los Angeles, California, 2007
- Genre: Rock
- Length: 3:33
- Label: Universal
- Songwriter: Jack Johnson
- Producer: Jack Johnson

Jack Johnson singles chronology
"If I Had Eyes" (2007)	"Sleep Through the Static" (2007)	"Same Girl" (2008)

"Sleep Through the Static" is third single from American singer/songwriter Jack Johnson's third studio album Sleep Through the Static.

The track features a short melodic opening played on a melodica with drums, electric guitar and bass following. The song features some complex lyrics, with a blues feeling and the representative Jack Johnson's groove.

Johnson implied in an interview with National Public Radio that the song was made to protest the Iraq War.

== Charts ==
Chart (2007)	Peak position
UK Singles Charts	150
