= List of number-one singles of 2008 (Australia) =

ARIA Charts number-one singles of 2008 < 2007 2009 >

Other Australian number-one charts of 2008
- albums
- urban singles
- dance singles
- club tracks
- digital tracks

Top Australian singles and albums of 2008
- Triple J Hottest 100
- top 25 singles
- top 25 albums

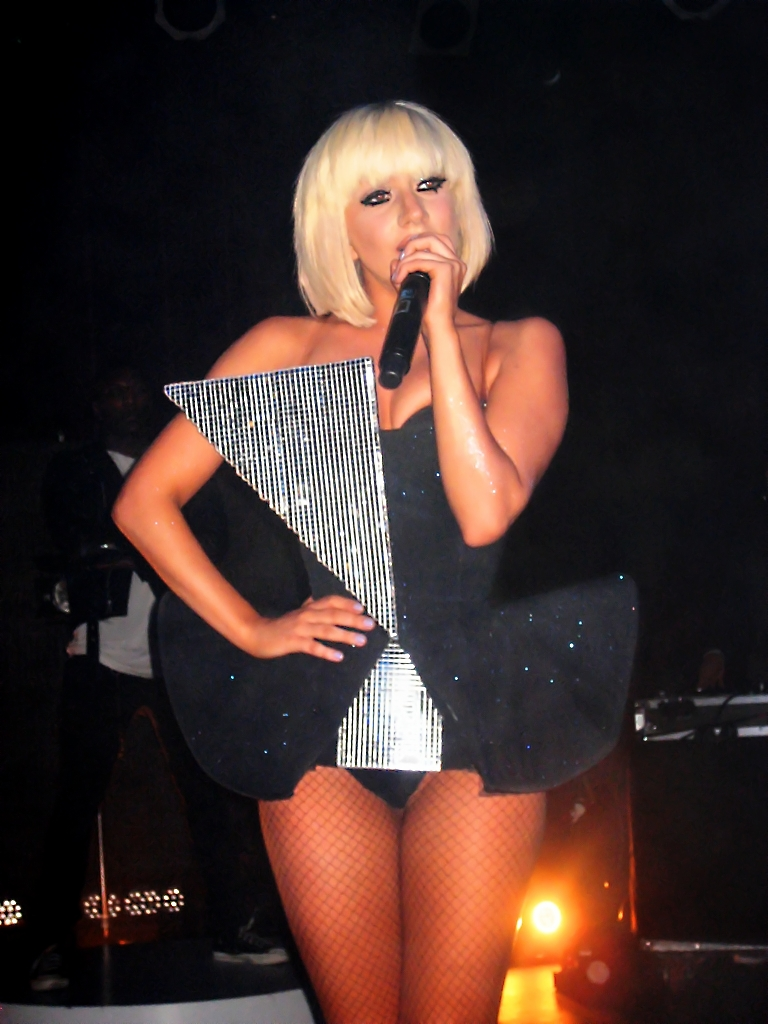
Lady Gaga earned her first and second number-one single when "Just Dance" and "Poker Face" both topped the ARIA Singles Chart. "Poker Face" was the longest running number-one single, having topped the chart for six weeks in 2008 and two additional weeks in 2009.

The ARIA Singles Chart ranks the best-performing singles in Australia. Its data, published by the Australian Recording Industry Association, is based collectively on each single's weekly physical and digital sales. In 2008, fifteen singles claimed the top spot, including Timbaland's "Apologize", which started its peak position in late 2007. Twelve acts achieved their first number-one single in Australia, either as a lead or featured artist: Leona Lewis, Flo Rida, T-Pain, Colbie Caillat, Gabriella Cilmi, Jordin Sparks, Katy Perry, Kid Rock, Lady Gaga, Colby O'Donis, Kings of Leon and Wes Carr. Five collaborations topped the chart. Lady Gaga earned two number-one singles during the year for "Just Dance" and "Poker Face".

"Poker Face" was the longest running number-one single, having topped the ARIA Singles Chart for six weeks in 2008 and two additional weeks in 2009. Perry's "I Kissed a Girl" topped the chart for six consecutive weeks, while Lewis' "Bleeding Love" and Cilmi's "Sweet About Me" both stayed at number one for five weeks. Rihanna's "Don't Stop the Music", Sparks' "No Air", Pink's "So What", and Kings of Leon's "Sex on Fire" each spent four weeks at the number-one spot.

== Chart history ==
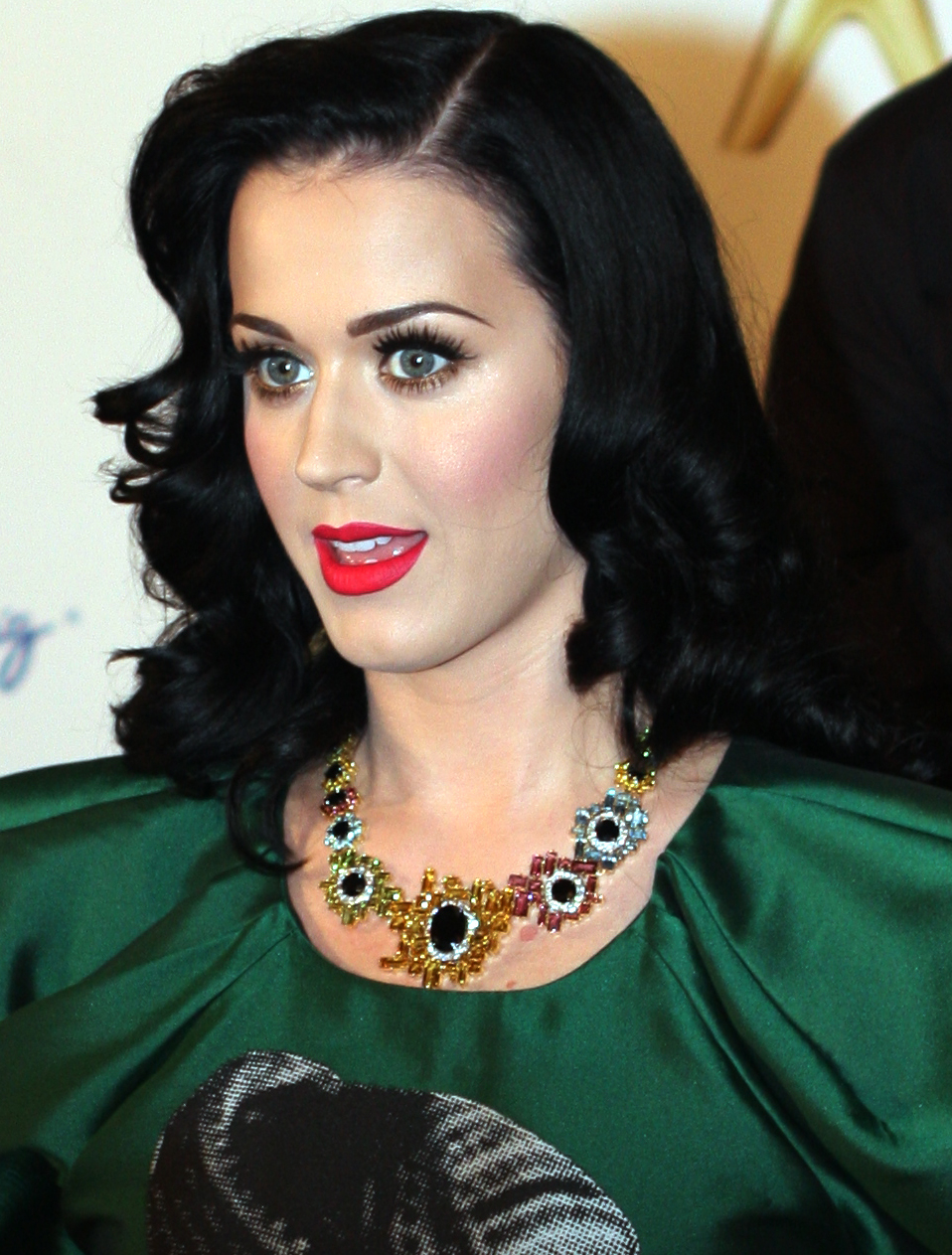
Katy Perry's "I Kissed a Girl" topped the ARIA Singles Chart for six consecutive weeks, becoming her first number-one single on the chart.

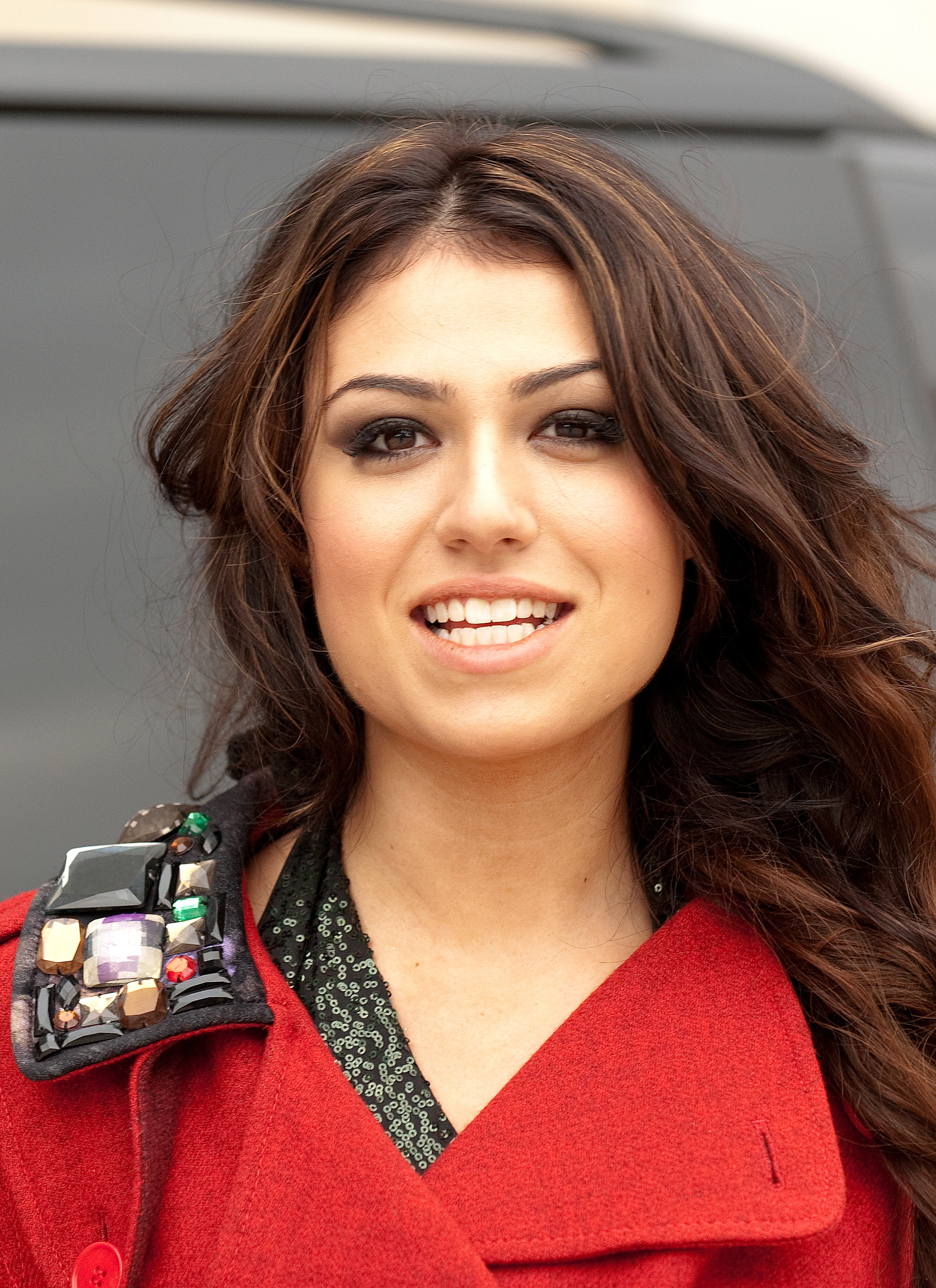
Gabriella Cilmi's "Sweet About Me" topped the ARIA Singles Chart for five non-consecutive weeks, becoming her first number-one single on the chart.

Key
The yellow background indicates the #1 song on ARIA's End of Year Singles Chart of 2008.

Date	Song	Artist(s)	Ref.
7 January	"Apologize"	Timbaland featuring OneRepublic	
14 January	"Apologize"	Timbaland featuring OneRepublic	
21 January	"Bleeding Love"	Leona Lewis	
28 January	"Bleeding Love"	Leona Lewis	
4 February	"Bleeding Love"	Leona Lewis	
11 February	"Bleeding Love"	Leona Lewis	
18 February	"Don't Stop the Music"	Rihanna	
25 February	"Bleeding Love"	Leona Lewis	
3 March	"Don't Stop the Music"	Rihanna	
10 March	"Don't Stop the Music"	Rihanna	
17 March	"Don't Stop the Music"	Rihanna	
24 March	"Low"	Flo Rida featuring T-Pain	
31 March	"Low"	Flo Rida featuring T-Pain	
7 April	"Bubbly"	Colbie Caillat	
14 April	"Sweet About Me"	Gabriella Cilmi	
21 April	"Low"	Flo Rida featuring T-Pain	
28 April	"4 Minutes"	Madonna featuring Justin Timberlake	
5 May	"4 Minutes"	Madonna featuring Justin Timberlake	
12 May	"4 Minutes"	Madonna featuring Justin Timberlake	
19 May	"Sweet About Me"	Gabriella Cilmi	
26 May	"Sweet About Me"	Gabriella Cilmi	
2 June	"Sweet About Me"	Gabriella Cilmi	
9 June	"Sweet About Me"	Gabriella Cilmi	
16 June	"No Air"	Jordin Sparks and Chris Brown	
23 June	"No Air"	Jordin Sparks and Chris Brown	
30 June	"No Air"	Jordin Sparks and Chris Brown	
7 July	"No Air"	Jordin Sparks and Chris Brown	
14 July	"I Kissed a Girl"	Katy Perry	
21 July	"I Kissed a Girl"	Katy Perry	
28 July	"I Kissed a Girl"	Katy Perry	
4 August	"I Kissed a Girl"	Katy Perry	
11 August	"I Kissed a Girl"	Katy Perry	
18 August	"I Kissed a Girl"	Katy Perry	
25 August	"All Summer Long"	Kid Rock	
1 September	"All Summer Long"	Kid Rock	
8 September	"All Summer Long"	Kid Rock	
15 September	"Just Dance"	Lady Gaga featuring Colby O'Donis	
22 September	"So What"	Pink	
29 September	"So What"	Pink	
6 October	"So What"	Pink	
13 October	"So What"	Pink	
20 October	"Sex on Fire"	Kings of Leon	
27 October	"Sex on Fire"	Kings of Leon	
3 November	"Sex on Fire"	Kings of Leon	
10 November	"Sex on Fire"	Kings of Leon	
17 November	"Poker Face"	Lady Gaga	
24 November	"Poker Face"	Lady Gaga	
1 December	"Poker Face"	Lady Gaga	
8 December	"Poker Face"	Lady Gaga	
15 December	"You"	Wes Carr	
22 December	"Poker Face"	Lady Gaga	
29 December	"Poker Face"	Lady Gaga	

== Number-one artists ==
Position	Artist	Weeks at No. 1
1	Lady Gaga	7
2	Katy Perry	6
3	Leona Lewis	5
3	Gabriella Cilmi	5
4	Rihanna	4
4	Jordin Sparks	4
4	Chris Brown	4
4	Pink	4
4	Kings of Leon	4
5	Flo Rida	3
5	T-Pain (as featuring)	3
5	Madonna	3
5	Justin Timberlake (as featuring)	3
5	Kid Rock	3
6	OneRepublic (as featuring)	2
6	Timbaland	2
7	Colbie Caillat	1
7	Colby O'Donis (as featuring)	1
7	Wes Carr	1

== See also ==
- 2008 in music
- List of number-one albums of 2008 (Australia)
- List of top 25 singles for 2008 in Australia
- List of top 10 singles in 2008 (Australia)
