= If I Had Eyes =

Single by Jack Johnson

from the album Sleep Through the Static
- B-side: "Let It Be Sung"
- Released: December 11, 2007
- Recorded: Los Angeles, California, 2007
- Genre: Soft rock
- Length: 3:59
- Label: Universal, Columbia
- Songwriter(s): Jack Johnson
- Producer(s): J.P. Plunier

Jack Johnson singles chronology
"Imagine" (2006)	"If I Had Eyes" (2007)	"Sleep Through the Static" (2007)

"If I Had Eyes" is the first single from American singer-songwriter Jack Johnson's fourth studio album, Sleep Through the Static. It was released exclusively on Brushfirerecords.com November 29. The official iTunes single was released on December 11, 2007.

The track features more electric guitar work, similar to that on his On and On album. The track is a mix of acoustic, jazz, and blues. Lyrically, the song expresses the sad breakup of a long-term relationship.

== Background and writing ==
Johnson elaborated to the Herald Sun about how his then 3-year-old son Moe inspired "If I Had Eyes": "He was drinking a lot of soya milk at the time. I told him if he kept drinking too much, he would grow a tail with an eyeball at the end. He looked at me trying to make sure I was kidding. When he figured that out, he attached his elbow to his butt and pointed his finger around the room. He had made this tail with an eyeball. He pointed at me and said, 'Dad, you look good.' I thought that was a sweet thing to say."

This inspired Johnson to immediately write If I Had Eyes. Johnson added: "I made a song that said, 'If I had an eyeball on the end of my tail, I'd tell you that you look good as I walked away'. I meant it literally, but once I thought about metaphors (Johnson's friends were divorcing), it was a beautiful way to put it. I switched it around, made it less silly, but kept my son's ideas. I need to give him a songwriting credit."

== Music video ==
The music video for "If I Had Eyes" shows Johnson and his fellow musicians (see below credits) performing the song in a recording studio. The video was shot in grayscale with a few other colors appearing, mostly from the instruments they're playing.

== Track listing ==
=== CD single ===
1. "If I Had Eyes" - 3:59
2. "Let It Be Sung" (with Matt Costa & Zach Gill) - 4:08

== Musicians ==
- Jack Johnson - vocals, guitar
- Adam Topol - drums
- Merlo Podlewski - bass
- Zach Gill - piano, clavinet, backup vocals
- Danny Riley - backup vocals
- JP Plunier - claps, backup vocals
- Emmett Malloy - claps
- Josh Arroyo - claps

== Charts ==
Chart (2007)	Peak position
Ö3 Austria Top 40	37
Canadian Singles Chart	11
German Media Control Charts	73
Iceland (Tónlistinn)	3
Netherlands Mega Single Top 100	60
New Zealand RIANZ Singles Chart	33
Swiss Singles Chart	30
UK Singles Chart	60
U.S. Billboard Hot 100	47
U.S. Billboard Modern Rock Tracks	7
Venezuela Pop Rock (Record Report)	2

== Certifications ==
Certifications for "If I Had Eyes"
Region	Certification	Certified units/sales
Australia (ARIA)	Gold	35,000^{‡}
Brazil (Pro-Música Brasil)	Gold	30,000^{‡}
Canada (Music Canada)	Gold	40,000^{‡}
^{‡} Sales+streaming figures based on certification alone.
