= Temple (Kings of Leon song) =

Single by Kings of Leon

from the album Mechanical Bull
- Released: October 14, 2013
- Genre: Alternative rock, Southern rock
- Length: 4:10
- Label: RCA
- Songwriters: Caleb Followill, Nathan Followill, Jared Followill, Matthew Followill
- Producer: Angelo Petraglia

Kings of Leon singles chronology
"Wait for Me" (2013)	"Temple" (2013)	"Beautiful War" (2013)

Music video
- "Temple" on YouTube

"Temple" is a song by American rock band Kings of Leon, issued as the third single from the band's sixth studio album Mechanical Bull.

== Critical reception ==
The song has received positive reception from critics. Simon Harper of UK magazine Clash positively compared the song to that of work from The Cure. Leonie Cooper of NME, while having given the parent album a middling rating, highlighted the song as being "the best thing [the band has] written in five years".

== Live performances ==
The band has performed the song on Jimmy Kimmel Live!, Late Night with Jimmy Fallon and Saturday Night Live.

== Charts ==
Chart (2013–14)	Peak position
Belgium (Ultratip Bubbling Under Flanders)	48
Canada Hot 100 (Billboard)	86
Canada Rock (Billboard)	1
Ireland (IRMA)	64
UK Singles (The Official Charts Company)	153
US Adult Alternative Airplay (Billboard)	18
US Alternative Airplay (Billboard)	20
US Mainstream Rock (Billboard)	29
US Rock & Alternative Airplay (Billboard)	19

== Release history ==
Region	Date	Format	Label
United States	October 14, 2013	Active rock radio	RCA Records
United States	October 14, 2013	Adult album alternative radio	RCA Records
United States	October 15, 2013	Modern rock radio	RCA Records
United Kingdom	April 7, 2014	Contemporary hit radio	RCA Records
