= Notion (Kings of Leon song) =

2009 single by Kings of Leon

Single by Kings of Leon

from the album Only by the Night
- Released: June 29, 2009
- Recorded: 2008
- Genre: Alternative rock; Southern rock
- Length: 3:00
- Label: RCA
- Songwriter: Kings of Leon
- Producers: Angelo Petraglia; Jacquire King

Kings of Leon singles chronology
"Revelry" (2009)	"Notion" (2009)	"Crawl" (2009)

Music video
- "Notion" on YouTube

"Notion" is a song recorded by American rock band Kings of Leon. The song was released as the fourth single (fifth in Australia) from their 2008 album, Only by the Night, on June 29, 2009. The song reached number one on the Billboard Alternative Songs chart for one week in of September 2009.

== Chart performance ==
On the Canadian Hot 100, the song peaked at number 52.

Despite heavy radio play on BBC Radio 1, the song missed the UK Singles Chart top 100 and peaked at number 107, the first time the band had missed the UK top 100 for a single.

The song has peaked at number 46 on the Australian ARIA Charts and has also become a radio hit there peaking at number six on the Australian Airplay charts.

== Music video ==
A music video was shot as a promotional effort for the single and was released on June 1, 2009. The director was Phil Griffin. It captures the band performing in a dimly-lit, debris-filled room with imploding fiery brick walls adjacent to an alleyway bordered by another brick barrier that is used by the lead singer in a manner suggestive of the Wailing Wall in Jerusalem.

== Track listing ==
iTunes download

1. "Notion" – 3:00
2. "Notion" (live in Amsterdam) – 3:01

Australian exclusive EP (physical)

1. "Notion" – 3:00
2. "Beneath the Surface" – 2:49
3. "Sex on Fire" (live from Cologne) – 3:31
4. "Notion" (live in Amsterdam) – 3:01
5. "The Bucket" (CSS remix) – 3:44

== Charts ==
Chart (2009)	Peak position
Australian ARIA Singles Chart	46
Belgian Ultratop 50 Singles (Flanders)	24
Canadian Hot 100	41
German Singles Chart	69
Irish Singles Chart	50
Mexico Ingles Airplay (Billboard)	10
Netherlands (Single Top 100)	92
New Zealand Singles Chart	25
Swedish Singles Chart	57
Switzerland Airplay (Schweizer Hitparade)	100
UK Singles Chart	107
US Billboard Hot 100	99
US Adult Alternative Airplay (Billboard)	19
US Alternative Airplay (Billboard)	1
US Hot Rock & Alternative Songs (Billboard)	14

== Certifications ==
Region	Certification	Certified units/sales
Australia (ARIA)	Gold	35,000^{‡}
United Kingdom (BPI)	Silver	200,000^{‡}
^{‡} Sales+streaming figures based on certification alone.
