= List of number-one digital tracks of 2008 (Australia) =

ARIA Charts number-one digital tracks of 2008 2009 >

Other Australian number-one charts of 2008
- albums
- singles
- urban singles
- dance singles
- club tracks

Top Australian singles and albums of 2008
- Triple J Hottest 100
- top 25 singles
- top 25 albums

The ARIA Digital Track Chart ranks the best-performing digital tracks of Australia. It is published by Australian Recording Industry Association (ARIA), an organisation who collects music data for the weekly ARIA Charts. To be eligible to appear on the chart, the recording must be a single not an EP and only paid downloads counted from downloadable outlets.

== Chart history ==
Key
†	Indicates number-one digital single of 2008

Issue date	Song	Artist(s)	Reference
7 January	"Apologize"	Timbaland featuring OneRepublic	
14 January	"Bleeding Love"	Leona Lewis	
21 January	"Bleeding Love"	Leona Lewis	
28 January	"Bleeding Love"	Leona Lewis	
4 February	"Bleeding Love"	Leona Lewis	
11 February	"Don't Stop the Music"	Rihanna	
18 February	"Don't Stop the Music"	Rihanna	
25 February	"Don't Stop the Music"	Rihanna	
3 March	"Don't Stop the Music"	Rihanna	
10 March	"Don't Stop the Music"	Rihanna	
17 March	"Low"†	Flo Rida featuring T-Pain	
24 March	"Low"†	Flo Rida featuring T-Pain	
31 March	"Low"†	Flo Rida featuring T-Pain	
7 April	"Bubbly"	Colbie Caillat	
14 April	"4 Minutes"	Madonna featuring Justin Timberlake	
21 April	"4 Minutes"	Madonna featuring Justin Timberlake	
28 April	"4 Minutes"	Madonna featuring Justin Timberlake	
5 May	"4 Minutes"	Madonna featuring Justin Timberlake	
12 May	"4 Minutes"	Madonna featuring Justin Timberlake	
19 May	"4 Minutes"	Madonna featuring Justin Timberlake	
26 May	"Sweet About Me"	Gabriella Cilmi	
2 June	"Sweet About Me"	Gabriella Cilmi	
9 June	"Sweet About Me"	Gabriella Cilmi	
16 June	"No Air"	Jordin Sparks featuring Chris Brown	
23 June	"No Air"	Jordin Sparks featuring Chris Brown	
30 June	"No Air"	Jordin Sparks featuring Chris Brown	
7 July	"I Kissed a Girl"	Katy Perry	
14 July	"I Kissed a Girl"	Katy Perry	
21 July	"I Kissed a Girl"	Katy Perry	
28 July	"I Kissed a Girl"	Katy Perry	
4 August	"I Kissed a Girl"	Katy Perry	
11 August	"Shake It"	Metro Station	
18 August	"Shake It"	Metro Station	
26 August	"So What"	Pink	
1 September	"So What"	Pink	
8 September	"Just Dance"	Lady Gaga	
15 September	"So What"	Pink	
22 September	"So What"	Pink	
29 September	"I'm Yours"	Jason Mraz	
6 October	"I'm Yours"	Jason Mraz	
13 October	"I'm Yours"	Jason Mraz	
20 October	"Sex on Fire"	Kings of Leon	
27 October	"Sex on Fire"	Kings of Leon	
3 November	"Sex on Fire"	Kings of Leon	
10 November	"Sex on Fire"	Kings of Leon	
17 November	"Poker Face"	Lady Gaga	
24 November	"Poker Face"	Lady Gaga	
1 December	"Poker Face"	Lady Gaga	
8 December	"Poker Face"	Lady Gaga	
15 December	"Poker Face"	Lady Gaga	
22 December	"Poker Face"	Lady Gaga	
29 December	"Poker Face"	Lady Gaga	

== Number-one artists ==
Position	Artist	Weeks at No. 1
1	Lady Gaga	8
2	Madonna	6
2	Justin Timberlake	6
3	Katy Perry	5
3	Rihanna	5
4	Kings of Leon	4
4	Leona Lewis	4
4	Pink	4
5	Gabriella Cilmi	3
5	Flo Rida	3
5	T-Pain	3
5	Jordin Sparks	3
5	Chris Brown	3
5	Jason Mraz	3
6	Metro Station	2
7	Colbie Caillat	1
7	Timbaland	1
7	OneRepublic	1

== See also ==
- List of number-one singles of 2008 (Australia)
