= Wait for Me (Kings of Leon song) =

Single by Kings of Leon

from the album Mechanical Bull
- Released: August 6, 2013
- Recorded: 2013
- Genre: Alternative rock
- Length: 3:29
- Label: RCA, Sony
- Songwriters: Caleb Followill, Nathan Followill, Jared Followill, Matthew Followill
- Producer: Angelo Petraglia

Kings of Leon singles chronology
"Supersoaker" (2013)	"Wait for Me" (2013)	"Temple" (2013)

"Wait for Me" is a song by American rock band Kings of Leon. The song was released in the United Kingdom on August 6, 2013 as the second single from their sixth studio album Mechanical Bull (2013). On Sunday August 11, it debuted at number 31 in the UK Singles Chart, and as of 2021, remains their most recent UK Top 40 hit.

== Track listings ==
- Digital download
1. "Wait for Me" – 3:29
- 7" vinyl
1. "Wait for Me" – 3:29
2. "Don't Matter" (Live) – 3:00

== Charts ==
=== Weekly charts ===
Weekly chart performance for "Wait for Me"
Chart (2013–2014)	Peak position
Austria (Ö3 Austria Top 40)	29
Belgium (Ultratip Bubbling Under Flanders)	5
Canada Hot 100 (Billboard)	71
Canada Rock (Billboard)	34
Germany (GfK)	34
Ireland (IRMA)	18
Netherlands (Single Top 100)	47
Scottish Singles Sales (Official Charts)	22
Switzerland (Schweizer Hitparade)	39
UK Singles (Official Charts)	31
US Bubbling Under Hot 100 (Billboard)	1
US Hot Rock & Alternative Songs (Billboard)	14
US Adult Alternative Airplay (Billboard)	16
US Alternative Airplay (Billboard)	10
US Mainstream Rock Airplay (Billboard)	31
US Rock & Alternative Airplay (Billboard)	15

Weekly chart performance for "Wait for Me"
Chart (2026)	Peak position
Ireland (IRMA)	15

=== Year-end charts ===
2013 year-end chart performance for "Wait for Me"
Chart (2013)	Position
Netherlands (Dutch Top 40)	139

2014 year-end chart performance for "Wait for Me"
Chart (2014)	Position
US Alternative Songs (Billboard)	37

== Certifications ==
Certifications and sales for "Wait for Me"
Region	Certification	Certified units/sales
United Kingdom (BPI)	Silver	200,000^{‡}
^{‡} Sales+streaming figures based on certification alone.

== Release history ==
Release dates for "Wait for Me"
Region	Date	Format	Label
United Kingdom	August 6, 2013	Digital download	RCA Records
United States	February 17, 2014	Modern rock radio	RCA Records
United States	March 31, 2014	Adult album alternative radio	RCA Records
