= Crawl (Kings of Leon song) =

Single by Kings of Leon

from the album Only by the Night
- Released: October 27, 2009
- Recorded: 2008
- Genre: Alternative rock
- Length: 4:06
- Label: RCA
- Songwriters: Caleb Followill; Nathan Followill; Jared Followill; Matthew Followill
- Producers: Angelo Petraglia; Jacquire King

Kings of Leon singles chronology
"Notion" (2009)	"Crawl" (2009)	"Radioactive" (2010)

"Crawl" is a song by American rock band Kings of Leon, and the second track of their 2008 album Only by the Night. It was the first track to be premiered from the album, with the band offering it as a free download on their website for a short period of time. The song was voted number 70 in the Triple J Hottest 100, 2008 countdown. In late October 2009, it was released as a single in Canada and the United States.

It was released as downloadable content for the Rock Band music video game series on July 21, 2009.

== Charts ==
The song charted at number 70 in Australia upon the album's release in 2008.

Chart (2008)	Peak position
Australia (ARIA)	70
UK Singles (OCC)	125
Chart (2009–2010)	Peak position
Canada (Canadian Hot 100)	73
Canada Rock (Billboard)	3
Mexico Ingles Airplay (Billboard)	50
US Hot Rock & Alternative Songs (Billboard)	42
US Rock & Alternative Airplay (Billboard)	42
