= Beautiful War (song) =

Single by Kings of Leon

from the album Mechanical Bull
- Released: December 9, 2013
- Recorded: 2013
- Genre: Rock; Southern rock
- Length: 5:09
- Label: RCA
- Songwriters: Caleb Followill; Nathan Followill; Jared Followill; Matthew Followill

Kings of Leon singles chronology
| "Temple" (2013) | "Beautiful War" (2013) | "Don't Matter" (2014) |

Music video
- "Beautiful War" on YouTube

"Beautiful War" is a song by American rock band Kings of Leon. The song was released as a digital download on December 9, 2013 through RCA Records as the fourth single from their sixth studio album Mechanical Bull (2013). The song was written by Caleb Followill, Nathan Followill, Jared Followill and Matthew Followill. The song is first demoed to other music artists such as Christina Aguilera, Kelly Clarkson and Westlife.

== Music video ==
A music video to accompany the release of "Beautiful War" was first released onto YouTube on November 22, 2013 at a total length of six minutes and thirty-five seconds. Garrett Hedlund pays homage to a fallen Cowboy whose name is Lane Frost. Also, the County in which the character is incarcerated is Lane Co.

== Track listing ==
Digital download
| No. | Title | Length |
|---|---|---|
| 1. | "Beautiful War" | 5:09 |

== Chart performance ==
=== Weekly charts ===
| Chart (2013) | Peak position |
|---|---|
| Belgium (Ultratip Bubbling Under Flanders) | 10 |
| Czech Republic Modern Rock (IFPI) | 5 |
| Ireland (IRMA) | 87 |
| UK Singles (Official Charts) | 98 |
