= List of top 25 singles for 2008 in Australia =

Top 25 singles of 2008 < 2007 2009 >

Other Australian top charts for 2008
- top 25 albums
- Triple J Hottest 100

Australian number-one charts of 2008
- albums
- singles
- urban singles
- dance singles
- club tracks
- digital tracks

The following lists the top 25 singles of 2008 in Australia from the Australian Recording Industry Association (ARIA) End of Year Singles Chart.

"Low" by Flo Rida featuring T-Pain was the biggest song of the year, peaking at #1 for three weeks and staying in the top 50 for 38 weeks. The longest stay at #1 was by Katy Perry's "I Kissed a Girl" which spent six weeks at the top spot. As of 12 February 2009, Lady Gaga's "Poker Face" has spent eight weeks on top of the charts, however five weeks were in 2008 and three in January 2009.

#	Title	Artist	Highest pos. reached	Weeks at No. 1
1.	"Low"	Flo Rida	1	3
2.	"So What"	Pink	1	4
3.	"Sweet About Me"	Gabriella Cilmi	1	4
4.	"Bleeding Love"	Leona Lewis	1	4
5.	"Sex on Fire"	Kings of Leon	1	4
6.	"I Kissed a Girl"	Katy Perry	1	6
7.	"Just Dance"	Lady Gaga feat. Colby O'Donis	1	1
8.	"No Air"	Jordin Sparks with Chris Brown	1	4
9.	"I'm Yours"	Jason Mraz	3	
10.	"All Summer Long"	Kid Rock	1	3
11.	"Shake It"	Metro Station	2	
12.	"Don't Stop the Music"	Rihanna	1	4
13.	"When I Grow Up"	The Pussycat Dolls	2	
14.	"Poker Face"	Lady Gaga	1	8*
15.	"4 Minutes"	Madonna feat. Justin Timberlake and Timbaland	1	3
16.	"Hot n Cold"	Katy Perry	4	
17.	"Dream Catch Me"	Newton Faulkner	5	
18.	"Pictures of You"	The Last Goodnight	3	
19.	"Black and Gold"	Sam Sparro	4	
20.	"Forever"	Chris Brown	7	
21.	"Untouched"	The Veronicas	2	
22.	"Disturbia"	Rihanna	6	
23.	"Crank That (Soulja Boy)"	Soulja Boy Tell 'Em	3	
24.	"Bubbly"	Colbie Caillat	1	1
25.	"Take a Bow"	Rihanna	3	

*5 weeks in 2008, and 3 in 2009
