= List of number-one urban singles of 2008 (Australia) =

ARIA Charts number-one urban singles of 2008 2009 >

Other Australian number-one charts of 2008
- albums
- singles
- dance singles
- club tracks
- digital tracks

Top Australian singles and albums of 2008
- Triple J Hottest 100
- top 25 singles
- top 25 albums

The ARIA Urban Chart is a chart that ranks the best-performing Urban tracks singles of Australia. It is published by Australian Recording Industry Association (ARIA), an organisation who collect music data for the weekly ARIA Charts. To be eligible to appear on the chart, the recording must be a single, and be "predominantly of a Urban nature".

== Chart history ==
Issue date	Song	Artist(s)	Reference
7 January	"Apologize"	Timbaland featuring OneRepublic	
14 January	"Apologize"	Timbaland featuring OneRepublic	
21 January	"Apologize"	Timbaland featuring OneRepublic	
28 January	"Apologize"	Timbaland featuring OneRepublic	
4 February	"Apologize"	Timbaland featuring OneRepublic	
11 February	"Don't Stop the Music"	Rihanna	
18 February	"Don't Stop the Music"	Rihanna	
25 February	"Don't Stop the Music"	Rihanna	
3 March	"Don't Stop the Music"	Rihanna	
10 March	"Don't Stop the Music"	Rihanna	
17 March	"Don't Stop the Music"	Rihanna	
24 March	"Low"	Flo Rida featuring T-Pain	
31 March	"Low"	Flo Rida featuring T-Pain	
7 April	"Low"	Flo Rida featuring T-Pain	
14 April	"Low"	Flo Rida featuring T-Pain	
21 April	"Low"	Flo Rida featuring T-Pain	
28 April	"Low"	Flo Rida featuring T-Pain	
5 May	"Low"	Flo Rida featuring T-Pain	
12 May	"Low"	Flo Rida featuring T-Pain	
19 May	"Low"	Flo Rida featuring T-Pain	
26 May	"Low"	Flo Rida featuring T-Pain	
2 June	"No Air"	Jordin Sparks featuring Chris Brown	
9 June	"No Air"	Jordin Sparks featuring Chris Brown	
16 June	"No Air"	Jordin Sparks featuring Chris Brown	
23 June	"No Air"	Jordin Sparks featuring Chris Brown	
30 June	"No Air"	Jordin Sparks featuring Chris Brown	
7 July	"No Air"	Jordin Sparks featuring Chris Brown	
14 July	"No Air"	Jordin Sparks featuring Chris Brown	
21 July	"When I Grow Up"	The Pussycat Dolls	
28 July	"When I Grow Up"	The Pussycat Dolls	
4 August	"When I Grow Up"	The Pussycat Dolls	
11 August	"When I Grow Up"	The Pussycat Dolls	
18 August	"When I Grow Up"	The Pussycat Dolls	
25 August	"When I Grow Up"	The Pussycat Dolls	
1 September	"When I Grow Up"	The Pussycat Dolls	
8 September	"When I Grow Up"	The Pussycat Dolls	
15 September	"When I Grow Up"	The Pussycat Dolls	
22 September	"Closer"	Ne-Yo	
29 September	"Disturbia"	Rihanna	
6 October	"Disturbia"	Rihanna	
13 October	"Disturbia"	Rihanna	
20 October	"Disturbia"	Rihanna	
27 October	"Disturbia"	Rihanna	
3 November	"Disturbia"	Rihanna	
10 November	"I Hate This Part"	The Pussycat Dolls	
17 November	"Live Your Life"	T.I. featuring Rihanna	
24 November	"If I Were a Boy"	Beyoncé	
1 December	"Live Your Life"	T.I. featuring Rihanna	
8 December	"Live Your Life"	T.I. featuring Rihanna	
15 December	"Live Your Life"	T.I. featuring Rihanna	
22 December	"Live Your Life"	T.I. featuring Rihanna	
29 December	"Live Your Life"	T.I. featuring Rihanna	

== Number-one artists ==
Position	Artist	Weeks at No. 1
1	Rihanna	18
2	Flo Rida	10
2	T-Pain	10
2	The Pussycat Dolls	10
3	Jordin Sparks	7
3	Chris Brown	7
4	T.I.	6
5	Timbaland	5
6	Beyoncé	1
6	Ne-Yo	1

== See also ==
- 2008 in music
- List of number-one singles of 2008 (Australia)
