= List of number-one club tracks of 2008 (Australia) =

ARIA Charts number-one club tracks of 2008 < 2007 2009 >

Other Australian number-one charts of 2008
- albums
- singles
- urban singles
- dance singles
- digital tracks

Top Australian singles and albums of 2008
- Triple J Hottest 100
- top 25 singles
- top 25 albums

This is the list of ARIA Club Chart number-one hits in 2008, compiled by the Australian Recording Industry Association (ARIA) from weekly DJ reports.

== 2008 ==
| Date | | Song | Artist(s) | Reference |
|---|---|---|---|---|
| January | 14 | "Don't Hold Back" | The Potbelleez | |
| January | 21 | "For Everyone" | The Aston Shuffle | |
| January | 28 | "For Everyone" | The Aston Shuffle | |
| February | 4 | "For Everyone" | The Aston Shuffle | |
| February | 11 | "For Everyone" | The Aston Shuffle | |
| February | 18 | "For Everyone" | The Aston Shuffle | |
| February | 25 | "Breathe" | Kaz James featuring Stu Stone | |
| March | 3 | "Breathe" | Kaz James featuring Stu Stone | |
| March | 10 | "Breathe" | Kaz James featuring Stu Stone | |
| March | 17 | "Breathe" | Kaz James featuring Stu Stone | |
| March | 24 | "Baby" | Pnau | |
| March | 31 | "Baby" | Pnau | |
| April | 7 | "Baby" | Pnau | |
| April | 14 | "Baby" | Pnau | |
| April | 21 | "Baby" | Pnau | |
| April | 28 | "Baby" | Pnau | |
| May | 5 | "Baby" | Pnau | |
| May | 12 | "This Boy's in Love" | The Presets | |
| May | 19 | "This Boy's in Love" | The Presets | |
| May | 26 | "Been a Long Time" | TV Rock featuring Rudy | |
| June | 2 | "Been a Long Time" | TV Rock featuring Rudy | |
| June | 9 | "Been a Long Time" | TV Rock featuring Rudy | |
| June | 16 | "The Best Thing (2008)" | Hook n Sling | |
| June | 23 | "The Best Thing (2008)" | Hook n Sling | |
| June | 30 | "The Best Thing (2008)" | Hook n Sling | |
| July | 7 | "The Best Thing (2008)" | Hook n Sling | |
| July | 14 | "The Best Thing (2008)" | Hook n Sling | |
| July | 21 | "The Best Thing (2008)" | Hook n Sling | |
| July | 28 | "The Best Thing (2008)" | Hook n Sling | |
| August | 4 | "The Best Thing (2008)" | Hook n Sling | |
| August | 11 | "I Want You" | Martin Solveig | |
| August | 18 | "I Want You" | Martin Solveig | |
| August | 25 | "I Want You" | Martin Solveig | |
| September | 1 | "I Want You" | Martin Solveig | |
| September | 8 | "Finally 2008" | Ce Ce Peniston | |
| September | 15 | "Finally 2008" | Ce Ce Peniston | |
| September | 22 | "Finally 2008" | Ce Ce Peniston | |
| September | 29 | "Finally 2008" | Ce Ce Peniston | |
| October | 6 | "Release Me" | Zoë Badwi | |
| October | 13 | "Release Me" | Zoë Badwi | |
| October | 20 | "Release Me" | Zoë Badwi | |
| October | 27 | "Release Me" | Zoë Badwi | |
| November | 3 | "Release Me" | Zoë Badwi | |
| November | 10 | "Release Me" | Zoë Badwi | |
| November | 17 | "Release Me" | Zoë Badwi | |
| November | 24 | "What a Wonderful World" | Axwell and Bob Sinclar featuring Ron Carroll | |
| December | 1 | "Blue Monday" | Kurd Maverick | |
| December | 8 | "Blue Monday" | Kurd Maverick | |
| December | 15 | "Blue Monday" | Kurd Maverick | |
| December | 22 | "Blue Monday" | Kurd Maverick | |

== Number-one artists ==
| Position | Artist | Weeks at No. 1 |
|---|---|---|
| 1 | Hook n Sling | 8 |
| 2 | Pnau | 7 |
| 2 | Zoë Badwi | 7 |
| 3 | The Aston Shuffle | 5 |
| 4 | CeCe Peniston | 4 |
| 4 | Kaz James | 4 |
| 4 | Kurd Maverick | 4 |
| 4 | Martin Solveig | 4 |
| 5 | TV Rock | 3 |
| 6 | The Presets | 2 |
| 7 | Axwell | 1 |
| 7 | Bob Sinclar | 1 |
| 7 | The Potbelleez | 1 |

== See also ==
- ARIA Charts
- List of number-one singles of 2008 (Australia)
- List of number-one albums of 2008 (Australia)
- 2008 in music
