= Sleep Through the Static =

Album by Jack Johnson

Studio album by Jack Johnson
- Released: February 5, 2008
- Recorded: Late Spring & Summer 2007
- Genre: Folk rock, soft rock
- Length: 51:27
- Label: Brushfire, Universal
- Producer: J.P. Plunier, Jack Johnson, Simon Wyatt, Ashleigh Davis

Jack Johnson chronology
Sing-A-Longs and Lullabies for the Film Curious George (2006)	Sleep Through the Static (2008)	En Concert (2009)

Singles from Sleep Through the Static
- 1. "If I Had Eyes" Released: December 11, 2007; 2. "Sleep Through the Static" Released: December 2007; 3. "Same Girl" Released: February 2008 (Brazil-exclusive); 4. "Hope" Released: May 2008; 5. "Go On" Released: November 2008 (Radio-exclusive single)

Professional ratings
Review scores
Source	Rating
AllMusic	3/5 stars
Billboard	(positive)
Blender	3.5/5 stars
The Boston Globe	(mixed)
Entertainment Weekly	(B+)
Rolling Stone	3/5 stars
The Guardian	2/5 stars
The Observer	4/5 stars
Slant Magazine	2/5 stars
Yahoo! Music UK	7/10 stars

Sleep Through the Static is the fourth studio album by American singer-songwriter Jack Johnson, released in the United States on February 5, 2008. The album was announced on Johnson's website as renovation began for the release of the album. It was recorded at the Los Angeles Solar Powered Plastic Plant, which makes it Johnson's first album made outside of Hawaii. It was produced by JP Plunier.

The album was played live for the first time at the BBC in December for a select number of fans. Despite having been reviewed mostly unenthusiastically by professional music critics, worldwide sales of the album were on par with Johnson's previous albums.

The first single, "If I Had Eyes", was released via Johnson's MySpace page on December 11, 2007. The second single from the album was "Hope" and was released on September, peaking at number No. 30 on the Billboard Modern Rock Tracks.

The album debuted at number one on the US Billboard 200 chart, selling about 375,000 copies in its first week, including 139,000 digital downloads. This was a record high for weekly digital album sales. It also debuted at number one on the Worldwide chart with sales of 577,000. It held the record at iTunes for most digital downloads in a single day, until Coldplay's Viva la Vida or Death and All His Friends set a new record.

Sleep Through the Static remained at number one on the Billboard 200 in its second week of release, by which time it had sold over 180,000 copies, as well as its third week, in which it sold 105,000 copies. It fell from the number one spot in its fourth week, in which it placed third with about 92,000 copies sold. The album was made #45 in Q's 50 Best Albums of the Year 2008.

== Track listing ==
All songs written by Jack Johnson, except where noted.

1. "All at Once" – 3:38
2. "Sleep Through the Static" – 3:43
3. "Hope" (Jack Johnson, Zach Rogue) – 3:42
4. "Angel" – 2:02
5. "Enemy" – 3:48
6. "If I Had Eyes" – 3:59
7. "Same Girl" – 2:10
8. "What You Thought You Need" – 5:27
9. "Adrift" – 3:56
10. "Go On" – 4:35
11. "They Do, They Don't" – 4:10
12. "While We Wait" – 1:26
13. "Monsoon" (Jack Johnson, Merlo Podlewski) – 4:17
14. "Losing Keys" – 4:28

Japanese bonus track
No.	Title	Length
15.	"Enemy" (Original Demo Version)

Europe/Australia bonus track
No.	Title	Length
15.	"Home" (Acoustic)	4:24

Remix bonus tracks (Europe/Argentina)
No.	Title	Length
1.	"Hope" (Nightmares On Wax Remix)	4:54
2.	"Losing Keys" (Katalyst Remix)	3:35
3.	"Monsoon" (Money Mark Remix)	4:24
4.	"Angel" (Kid Koala Remix)	3:30
5.	"They Do, They Don't" (DJ Tropikal Remix)	4:43
6.	"Hope" (Mario C. Remix)	3:34

== Personnel ==
- Jack Johnson – vocals and guitar
- Adam Topol – drums
- Merlo Podlewski – bass
- Madison Young – flute and tambourine
- Zach Gill – keys and vocals
- Danny Riley – backup vocals on "If I Had Eyes"
- JP Plunier – backup vocals and claps on "If I Had Eyes"
- Emmett Malloy and Josh Arroyo – hand claps on "If I Had Eyes"
- Trent Johnson – acoustic guitar on "Go On"

== Charts ==
=== Weekly charts ===
Chart (2008)	Peak position
Australian Albums (ARIA)	1
Austrian Albums (Ö3 Austria)	3
Belgian Albums (Ultratop Flanders)	8
Belgian Albums (Ultratop Wallonia)	34
Canadian Albums (Billboard)	1
Danish Albums (Hitlisten)	5
Dutch Albums (Album Top 100)	4
French Albums (SNEP)	6
German Albums (Offizielle Top 100)	2
Greek Albums (IFPI)	9
Irish Albums (IRMA)	1
New Zealand Albums (RMNZ)	1
Norwegian Albums (VG-lista)	17
Portuguese Albums (AFP)	3
Scottish Albums (OCC)	1
Spanish Albums (Promusicae)	14
Swedish Albums (Sverigetopplistan)	13
Swiss Albums (Schweizer Hitparade)	2
UK Albums (OCC)	1
US Billboard 200	1
US Top Rock Albums (Billboard)	1

=== Year-end charts ===
Chart (2008)	Position
Australian Albums (ARIA)	11
Austrian Albums (Ö3 Austria)	49
Belgian Albums (Ultratop Flanders)	88
Canadian Albums (Billboard)	7
Dutch Albums (Album Top 100)	47
French Albums (SNEP)	96
German Albums (Offizielle Top 100)	43
New Zealand Albums (RMNZ)	24
Swiss Albums (Schweizer Hitparade)	21
UK Albums (OCC)	69
US Billboard 200	14
US Top Rock Albums (Billboard)	4

== Certifications and sales ==
Region	Certification	Certified units/sales
Australia (ARIA)	2× Platinum	140,000^{‡}
Austria (IFPI Austria)	Gold	10,000^{*}
Canada (Music Canada)	2× Platinum	193,000
Denmark (IFPI Danmark)	Platinum	20,000^{‡}
Germany (BVMI)	Gold	100,000^{^}
Ireland (IRMA)	Gold	7,500^{^}
Japan (RIAJ)	Gold	100,000^{^}
New Zealand (RMNZ)	Platinum	15,000^{^}
Switzerland (IFPI Switzerland)	Gold	15,000^{^}
United Kingdom (BPI)	Gold	100,000^{^}
United States (RIAA)	Platinum	1,000,000^{^}
^{*} Sales figures based on certification alone.^{^} Shipments figures based on certification alone.^{‡} Sales+streaming figures based on certification alone.

Sleep Through the Static: Remixed

Remix album by Jack Johnson
- Released: September 23, 2008
- Recorded: 2008
- Genre: Folk rock
- Label: Brushfire, Columbia
- Producer: Debbie Shanks, Jack Johnson, J.P. Plunier, Simon Wyatt

== Remix ==
Sleep Through the Static: Remixed is a 2008 remix album of songs from Sleep Through the Static. The release features video tracks as well as eight new tracks.

=== Audio ===
1. "Hope" (Nightmares on Wax Remix)
2. "Losing Keys" (Katalyst Remix)
3. "Monsoon" (Money Mark Casio Remix)
4. "Angel" (Kid Koala Remix)
5. "They Do, They Don't" (DJ Tropikal Remix)
6. "Hope" (Mario C. Remix)
7. "If I Had Eyes" (Culver City Dub Collective Remix)
8. "Enemy" (Worst Friends Remix)

=== Video ===
1. "Adrift" (live studio session)
2. "Enemy" (live studio session)
3. "Sleep Through the Static/I Love You and Buddha Too" (live studio sessions)
