= Supersoaker (song) =

Single by Kings of Leon

from the album Mechanical Bull
- Released: July 17, 2013
- Recorded: 2013
- Genre: Alternative rock; new wave
- Length: 3:50
- Label: RCA, Columbia, Sony
- Songwriters: Caleb Followill, Nathan Followill, Jared Followill, Matthew Followill
- Producer: Angelo Petraglia

Kings of Leon singles chronology
"Back Down South" (2011)	"Supersoaker" (2013)	"Wait for Me" (2013)

Music video
- "Supersoaker" on YouTube

"Supersoaker" is a song by American rock band Kings of Leon. The song was written by Caleb Followill, Nathan Followill, Jared Followill, and Matthew Followill and produced by Angelo Petraglia. It was released on July 17, 2013 as the lead single from their sixth studio album Mechanical Bull (2013), and peaked at number 32 on the UK Singles Chart.

On September 24, 2013, Kings of Leon performed "Supersoaker" on ABC's morning show Good Morning America.

== Music video ==
The music video for the song was directed by W.I.Z. The clip, which shows a love story set in the 1950s, was described by W.I.Z. as "an imagined hybrid of pop-art screenprint, hand tinting and Technicolour film". W.I.Z. also explained that "[We wanted] playful, sensual ideas of teen angst, rock and roll and Americana; we wanted to a make a piece that was urgent as well as effortless, precision with abandon".

== Track listings ==
- Digital download
1. "Supersoaker" – 3:50
- 7" vinyl single
1. "Supersoaker" – 3:50
2. "Work on Me" – 4:04

== Charts ==
=== Weekly charts ===
Weekly chart performance for "Supersoaker"
Chart (2013)	Peak position
Australia (ARIA)	43
Belgium (Ultratip Bubbling Under Flanders)	4
Canada (Canadian Hot 100)	61
Canada Rock (Billboard)	1
Czech Republic Modern Rock (IFPI)	1
Germany (GfK)	76
Ireland (IRMA)	19
Japan (Japan Hot 100) (Billboard)	61
Mexico Ingles Airplay (Billboard)	35
Netherlands (Single Top 100)	70
Switzerland Airplay (Schweizer Hitparade)	74
UK Singles (OCC)	32
US Bubbling Under Hot 100 (Billboard)	6
US Hot Rock & Alternative Songs (Billboard)	18
US Rock & Alternative Airplay (Billboard)	8

=== Year-end charts ===
Year-end chart performance for "Supersoaker"
Chart (2013)	Position
US Hot Rock Songs (Billboard)	56
US Rock Airplay (Billboard)	32

== Certifications ==
Certifications for "Supersoaker"
Region	Certification	Certified units/sales
Mexico (AMPROFON)	Gold	30,000^{‡}
New Zealand (RMNZ)	Gold	15,000^{‡}
United Kingdom (BPI)	Silver	200,000^{‡}
^{‡} Sales+streaming figures based on certification alone.

== Release history ==
Release dates and formats for "Supersoaker"
Region	Date	Format	Label
United Kingdom	July 17, 2013	Digital download	RCA Records
United States	July 23, 2013	Modern rock radio	RCA Records
United States	September 16, 2013	7" vinyl	RCA Records, Columbia Records
