= Use Somebody =

2008 single by Kings of Leon

Single by Kings of Leon

from the album Only by the Night
- Released: December 8, 2008
- Recorded: 2008
- Studio: Blackbird (Berry Hill, Tennessee)
- Genre: Alternative rock; pop rock; arena rock
- Length: 3:51
- Label: RCA
- Songwriters: Caleb Followill; Jared Followill; Matthew Followill; Nathan Followill
- Producers: Jacquire King; Angelo Petraglia

Kings of Leon singles chronology
"Sex on Fire" (2008)	"Use Somebody" (2008)	"Revelry" (2009)

Audio sample
- Kings of Leon – "Use Somebody": file; help

Music video
- "Use Somebody" on YouTube

"Use Somebody" is a song recorded by the American rock group Kings of Leon. It was the second single from the band's fourth studio album Only by the Night, and it entered American and British charts on December 8, 2008, three weeks after the album release. The single was augmented with a music video released a month later.

The single received heavy airplay in Scandinavia, the Republic of Ireland, Germany, the United Kingdom and Australia, where it was number one on the Official Airplay Chart for six consecutive weeks. It was a huge success in the U.S., where it topped multiple airplay formats and reached number four on the Hot 100 and number one on the Pop Songs chart.

The song received positive reviews and in 2010 at the 52nd Grammy Awards won Grammy Awards for Record of the Year, Best Rock Performance by a Duo or Group with Vocal and Best Rock Song. It was also nominated for Song of the Year. "Use Somebody" is written in the key of C major.

== Critical reception ==
The song has received generally positive reviews from music critics. Mikael Wood of Entertainment Weekly called "Use Somebody" a highlight of the album, describing the song as "a too-cool hipster's cry for comfort". Nick Levine of Digital Spy said, "With its Springsteen-style 'oooah-woooah's, gathering storm of guitars and lusty, longing vocals from Caleb Followill, it's nearly as infectious as 'Sex on Fire'." Gavin Haynes of NME praised the song as "easily the best 80's power ballad of 2008", but cautioned that the band "may be in danger of mistaking bluster for brilliance".

== Chart performance ==
In the United States, "Use Somebody" became the band's mainstream breakthrough. Peaking at number four on the Hot 100, it gave the band their first top five hit there, and spent 57 weeks on the chart. On United States radio, the song was a multi-format smash, becoming just the fourth song in history to top the Mainstream Top 40, Adult Top 40, Alternative Songs, and Triple A charts. (Preceding it were "Slide" by the Goo Goo Dolls, "Every Morning" by Sugar Ray, and "Boulevard of Broken Dreams" by Green Day.) The song first reached number one on the Billboard Hot Modern Rock Tracks chart (now called the "Alternative" chart), their second of three consecutive singles to top that chart. "Use Somebody" also reached number one on the Adult Top 40 chart, and later topped the Mainstream Top 40 chart as well. It reached over four million downloads in the US by July 2013.

In the United Kingdom, "Use Somebody" peaked at number two on the UK Singles Chart and spent an unbroken 40 weeks on the chart, only dropping out due to the surge in sales of Michael Jackson titles immediately after his death; after an absence of just one week, it was back for another 20 weeks, peaking at number 25. It has reappeared on further occasions since, and has now spent 77 weeks on the top 75, making it the 14th longest runner of all time, six places behind "Sex on Fire" with its 90 weeks.

== Music video ==
Directed by Sophie Muller, who also directed the video for "Sex on Fire" and would later direct "Radioactive", the video features tour footage of the band, in addition to Caleb singing while sitting on a sofa in a penthouse suite overlooking the New York City skyline at night.

== Track listings ==
CD single

1. "Use Somebody" – 3:51
2. "Knocked Up" (Lykke Li vs. Rodeo remix) – 5:34

iTunes exclusive EP

1. "Use Somebody" – 3:51
2. "Knocked Up" (Lykke Li vs. Rodeo remix) – 5:34
3. "Frontier City" – 3:36
4. "The Bucket" (CSS remix) – 3:43

== Personnel ==
- Caleb Followill – lead vocals, rhythm guitar
- Nathan Followill – drums, backing vocals
- Matthew Followill – lead guitar, backing vocals
- Jared Followill – bass, backing vocals

== Charts ==
=== Weekly charts ===
Chart (2008–2010)	Peak position
Australia (ARIA)	2
Austria (Ö3 Austria Top 40)	12
Belgium (Ultratop 50 Flanders)	1
Belgium (Ultratop 50 Wallonia)	19
Canada Hot 100 (Billboard)	8
Canada CHR/Top 40 (Billboard)	3
Canada Hot AC (Billboard)	5
Canada Rock (Billboard)	1
Denmark (Tracklisten)	9
France (SNEP)	44
Germany (GfK)	9
Ireland (IRMA)	6
Japan (Japan Hot 100)	42
Mexico Ingles Airplay (Billboard)	13
Netherlands (Dutch Top 40)	7
Netherlands (Single Top 100)	11
New Zealand (Recorded Music NZ)	5
Norway (VG-lista)	5
Scottish Singles Sales (Official Charts)	12
Sweden (Sverigetopplistan)	7
Switzerland (Schweizer Hitparade)	2
UK Singles (Official Charts)	2
US Billboard Hot 100	4
US Adult Alternative Airplay (Billboard)	1
US Adult Contemporary (Billboard)	13
US Adult Pop Airplay (Billboard)	1
US Alternative Airplay (Billboard)	1
US Hot Rock & Alternative Songs (Billboard)	2
US Mainstream Rock (Billboard)	25
US Pop Airplay (Billboard)	1

Chart (2013)	Peak position
South Korea (Gaon)	188

=== Year-end charts ===
Chart (2008)	Position
Australia (ARIA)	30
UK Singles (OCC)	51

Chart (2009)	Position
Australia (ARIA)	38
Austria (Ö3 Austria Top 40)	58
Belgium (Ultratop Flanders)	3
Belgium (Ultratop Wallonia)	55
Canada (Canadian Hot 100)	10
Germany (Official German Charts)	58
Netherlands (Dutch Top 40)	13
Netherlands (Single Top 100)	41
New Zealand (RIANZ)	47
Sweden (Sverigetopplistan)	22
Switzerland (Schweizer Hitparade)	47
UK Singles (OCC)	13
US Billboard Hot 100	14
US Adult Top 40 (Billboard)	3
US Hot Rock Songs (Billboard)	1
US Mainstream Top 40 (Billboard)	11
Chart (2010)	Position
UK Singles (OCC)	179
US Billboard Hot 100	87
US Adult Contemporary (Billboard)	37
US Adult Top 40 (Billboard)	34

=== Decade-end charts ===
Chart (2000–09)	Position
Australia Singles (ARIA)	27
UK Singles (Official Charts Company)	32

=== All-time charts ===
Chart	Position
US Adult Alternative Airplay (Billboard)	15
US Adult Top 40 (Billboard)	24
UK Singles (Official Charts Company)	118

== Certifications ==
Region	Certification	Certified units/sales
Australia (ARIA)	5× Platinum	350,000^{^}
Austria (IFPI Austria)	Gold	15,000^{*}
Belgium (BRMA)	Platinum	
Denmark (IFPI Danmark)	Platinum	15,000^{^}
Germany (BVMI)	Platinum	600,000^{‡}
Italy (FIMI)	Gold	25,000^{‡}
Mexico (AMPROFON)	2× Platinum+Gold	150,000^{‡}
New Zealand (RMNZ)	7× Platinum	210,000^{‡}
Spain (Promusicae)	Gold	30,000^{‡}
Sweden (GLF)	Gold	10,000^{‡}
Switzerland (IFPI Switzerland)	Gold	15,000^{^}
United Kingdom (BPI)	5× Platinum	3,000,000^{‡}
United States (RIAA)	Platinum	1,000,000
^{*} Sales figures based on certification alone.^{^} Shipments figures based on certification alone.^{‡} Sales+streaming figures based on certification alone.

== Release history ==
Release dates and formats for "Use Somebody"
Region	Date	Format	Label(s)	Ref.
United States	June 8, 2009	Mainstream airplay	RCA	

== Notable cover versions ==
The song has attracted many cover versions, with CBS affiliate Live 105 radio listing the top 10 covers and Stereogum website listing the top 15, both lists published in 2010.

- Pixie Lott performed a cover version of the song which peaked at number 41 on the UK Singles Chart, due to it being a B-side to her number one single "Mama Do (Uh Oh, Uh Oh)".
- Dutch singer Laura Jansen covered a piano ballad-version of "Use Somebody". The song debuted on the Dutch Top 40 chart. It entered the charts on the thirty-fifth spot but quickly rose towards number 14. Her cover was later remixed by Dutch DJ Armin van Buuren.
- English electronic music group Ultrabeat released their cover as a single in 2009. The song peaked at number 100 on the UK Singles Chart.
- Scala & Kolacny Brothers covered the song with the all-girls choir for their album Circle. A video produced for their cover was nominated for an MTV Freshman Video Award.

== See also ==
- List of best-selling singles
- List of best-selling singles in the United States
- List of Billboard Alternative Songs number ones of the 2000s
- List of Billboard Mainstream Top 40 number-one songs of 2009
- List of Ultratop 50 number-one singles of 2009
