= Charmer (Kings of Leon song) =

Single by Kings of Leon

from the album Because of the Times
- Released: October 29, 2007
- Genre: Hard rock, garage rock, indie rock
- Length: 2:56
- Label: Columbia
- Songwriter: Kings of Leon
- Producers: Ethan Johns; Angelo Petraglia

Kings of Leon singles chronology
"Fans" (2007)	"Charmer" (2007)	"Sex on Fire" (2008)

Music video
- "Charmer" on YouTube

"Charmer" is a song by American rock band Kings of Leon, and is the third single released from their 2007 album Because of the Times. It is the second track on the album.

The song was released on October 29, 2007 in the UK and compared to previous releases reached a lowly No. 85 on the UK Singles Chart. In October 2011, NME placed it at number 115 on its list "150 Best Tracks of the Past 15 Years".

In an interview with the BBC backstage at the Reading Festival, frontman Caleb Followill let slip that the video, filmed in the UK by director Robert Hales, would involve a hypnotist; he said, "There was an actual hypnotist there, he was meant to hypnotise us, but I dunno, we must have too strong a will, he couldn't do it so we faked it." He also commented: "It's one of the best looking videos we've done so far, we spent a lot of money on it."

== Track listing ==
CD & 7" vinyl:

1. "Charmer" 3:00
2. "My Party" (Kenna & Chad Hugo Remix) 3:41

== Charts ==
Chart (2007)	Peak position
Scottish Singles Sales (Official Charts)	31
UK Singles (Official Charts)	85
