= List of number-one dance singles of 2008 (Australia) =

ARIA Charts number-one dance singles of 2008 < 2007 2009 >

Other Australian number-one charts of 2008
- albums
- singles
- urban singles
- club tracks
- digital tracks

Top Australian singles and albums of 2008
- Triple J Hottest 100
- top 25 singles
- top 25 albums

The ARIA Dance Chart is a chart that ranks the best-performing dance singles of Australia. It is published by Australian Recording Industry Association (ARIA), an organisation who collect music data for the weekly ARIA Charts. To be eligible to appear on the chart, the recording must be a single, and be "predominantly of a dance nature, or with a featured track of a dance nature, or included in the ARIA Club Chart or a comparable overseas chart".

== Chart history ==
Issue date	Song	Artist(s)	Reference
7 January	"Don't Hold Back"	The Potbelleez	
14 January	"Don't Hold Back"	The Potbelleez	
21 January	"Don't Hold Back"	The Potbelleez	
28 January	"Don't Hold Back"	The Potbelleez	
4 February	"Piece of Me"	Britney Spears	
11 February	"Piece of Me"	Britney Spears	
18 February	"Piece of Me"	Britney Spears	
25 February	"Piece of Me"	Britney Spears	
3 March	"Piece of Me"	Britney Spears	
10 March	"Piece of Me"	Britney Spears	
17 March	"Piece of Me"	Britney Spears	
24 March	"Can't Sing a Different Song"	Ricki-Lee	
31 March	"Piece Of Me"	Britney Spears	
7 April	"Piece Of Me"	Britney Spears	
14 April	"Piece Of Me"	Britney Spears	
21 April	"Piece Of Me"	Britney Spears	
28 April	"Piece Of Me"	Britney Spears	
5 May	"Piece Of Me"	Britney Spears	
12 May	"My People"	The Presets	
19 May	"Break the Ice"	Britney Spears	
26 May	"Break the Ice"	Britney Spears	
2 June	"Break the Ice"	Britney Spears	
9 June	"Break the Ice"	Britney Spears	
16 June	"This Boy's in Love"	The Presets	
23 June	"Black and Gold"	Sam Sparro	
30 June	"Black and Gold"	Sam Sparro	
7 July	"Black and Gold"	Sam Sparro	
14 July	"Black and Gold"	Sam Sparro	
21 July	"Black and Gold"	Sam Sparro	
28 July	"Black and Gold"	Sam Sparro	
4 August	"Black and Gold"	Sam Sparro	
11 August	"Black and Gold"	Sam Sparro	
18 August	"Just Dance"	Lady Gaga	
25 August	"Just Dance"	Lady Gaga	
1 September	"Just Dance"	Lady Gaga	
8 September	"Just Dance"	Lady Gaga	
15 September	"Just Dance"	Lady Gaga	
22 September	"Just Dance"	Lady Gaga	
29 September	"Just Dance"	Lady Gaga	
6 October	"Just Dance"	Lady Gaga	
13 October	"Just Dance"	Lady Gaga	
20 October	"Just Dance"	Lady Gaga	
27 October	"Just Dance"	Lady Gaga	
3 November	"Womanizer"	Britney Spears	
10 November	"Poker Face"	Lady Gaga	
17 November	"Poker Face"	Lady Gaga	
24 November	"Poker Face"	Lady Gaga	
1 December	"Poker Face"	Lady Gaga	
8 December	"Poker Face"	Lady Gaga	
15 December	"Poker Face"	Lady Gaga	
22 December	"Poker Face"	Lady Gaga	
29 December	"Poker Face"	Lady Gaga	

== Number-one artists ==
Position	Artist	Weeks at No. 1
1	Lady Gaga	19
2	Britney Spears	18
3	Sam Sparro	8
4	The Potbelleez	4
5	The Presets	2
6	Ricki-Lee	1

== See also ==
- 2008 in music
- List of number-one singles of 2008 (Australia)
- List of number-one club tracks of 2008 (Australia)
