= On Call (song) =

- 7" picture sleeve and CD cover

Single by Kings of Leon

from the album Because of the Times
- B-side: "My Third House"
- Released: March 26, 2007
- Genre: Alternative rock
- Length: 3:22
- Label: Columbia
- Songwriter: Kings of Leon
- Producers: Ethan Johns, Angelo

Kings of Leon singles chronology
"King of the Rodeo" (2005)	"On Call" (2007)	"Fans" (2007)

Alternative cover
- US iTunes Store cover

Music video
- "On Call" on YouTube

"On Call" is a song by American rock band Kings of Leon, released as the third track from their 2007 album Because of the Times. The song was also released as the first single from that album on March 26, 2007, in the United Kingdom. Accompanied by the B-side, "My Third House", the single peaked at number 18 on the UK Singles Chart in April and reached the top 30 in Ireland and New Zealand. In Australia, the song placed at number three on the 2007 Triple J Hottest 100 of 2007.

== Track listing ==
7" (886970736176), CD (886970736022)

1. "On Call" – 3:23
2. "My Third House" – 3:56

== Charts ==
Chart (2007)	Peak position
Belgium (Ultratip Bubbling Under Flanders)	4
Ireland (IRMA)	28
New Zealand (Recorded Music NZ)	26
Scottish Singles Sales (Official Charts)	8
UK Singles (Official Charts)	18

== Certifications ==
Region	Certification	Certified units/sales
United Kingdom (BPI)	Silver	200,000^{‡}
^{‡} Sales+streaming figures based on certification alone.
