= Sex on Fire =

2008 single by Kings of Leon

Single by Kings of Leon

from the album Only by the Night
- B-side: "Beneath the Surface"
- Released: August 11, 2008
- Recorded: April 23, 2008
- Studio: Blackbird (Berry Hill, Tennessee)
- Genre: Alternative rock; arena rock
- Length: 3:24 (album version); 3:33 (radio edit)
- Label: RCA
- Songwriters: Caleb Followill; Jared Followill; Matthew Followill; Nathan Followill
- Producers: Angelo Petraglia; Jacquire King

Kings of Leon singles chronology
"Charmer" (2007)	"Sex on Fire" (2008)	"Use Somebody" (2008)

Music video
- "Sex on Fire" on YouTube

"Sex on Fire" is a song by American rock band Kings of Leon. It was released on August 11, 2008, as the lead single from their fourth studio album, Only by the Night (2008). The song gave the band their first number-one single in Australia, Finland, Ireland, and the United Kingdom, charting at the top spot on digital downloads alone in the latter country, before its physical release. In September 2009, it was Britain's second most-downloaded digital single ever. The song has sold 1.2 million copies in the United Kingdom as of November 2012. It has also gained significant popularity in the United States, reaching number one on the Hot Modern Rock Tracks chart and number 56 on the Billboard Hot 100, making it the band's third-highest-charting song there on the latter chart.

At the 51st Annual Grammy Awards, "Sex on Fire" was nominated for two awards: Best Rock Song, and Best Rock Vocal Performance by a Duo or Group, winning the latter. Channel V Australia named the song as the third biggest hit of 2008. It was voted number one in Triple J Hottest 100 countdown for 2008. Following the success of the follow-up single "Use Somebody" in the United States on pop radio, the track was re-serviced to US pop radio in November. Remixes of both songs were used for the runway soundtrack in the 2009 Victoria's Secret Fashion Show.

== Composition ==
Musically, "Sex on Fire" has been described as alternative rock and arena rock. The song was written about lead singer Caleb's then-girlfriend (and now-wife), model Lily Aldridge. In an interview with Robbie, Marieke and the Doctor on Australian radio station Triple J, Nathan Followill explained that the band never intended the song to be named "Sex on Fire" and that it was not intended to be about sexuality.

They were totally different lyrics. Depending on whether a song starts with a melody or starts with lyrics, you know if it starts with a melody you just keep playing the melody over and over until you get it down and just throw in any lyrics that fit the verbal flow. It was actually going to be "Set Us on Fire", but one of the sound mixers in the studio walked in as we were playing and said, "'Sex on Fire', huh?" And it just kind of became a running joke, and we stuck with it.

Nathan also said that some lyrics tried were "Socks on Fire", "Snatch on Fire", and "Cocks on Fire". The song is played in the key of E major at a tempo of 153 bpm. The vocal range is B3–G♯4.

== Critical reception ==
"Sex on Fire" received generally positive reviews. Digital Spy rated the song four stars out of five, describing it as "a truly stirring single that will be a definite highlight on their winter arena tour". Planet Sound also rated the song 9/10. However, Caleb Followill originally thought the song was "terrible"; according to Spin Magazine, it was almost ditched during recording. Despite giving the album a 4 out of 5, Spin thought the song was "silly". The song was number 40 on Rolling Stone's list of the 100 Best Songs of 2008. The song was used for the trailer of the 2009 movie Stay Cool.

In 2016, Johnny Borrell of Razorlight called this song "the apex, death and afterlife of landfill indie all in one go" and noted its similarity to Stereophonics's "Dakota" from 2005.

== Chart performance ==
In the United Kingdom, "Sex on Fire" entered the official UK Singles Chart at number one on September 14, 2008 ― for the week ending date September 20, 2008 ― and went on to an unbroken 42 weeks on the chart, only dropping out due to the surge in sales of Michael Jackson titles immediately after his death, but after a two-week absence it was back for another 37 weeks, re-entering the top 10 of the UK Singles Chart at number six in September 2009. Further reappearances extended its tally of weeks to 90, making it the third most charted single of all time.

In Germany, the single debuted at number 97 on the German Singles Chart, and began to rise and fall in the next several weeks. In its 32nd week on the chart, the song finally reached its peak of number 33. As of February 2011, the song had been on the chart for 60 weeks, a huge effort for a single that did not reach the top 20. In February 2011, due to the long stay on the German Singles Chart, the single was certificated with Gold for more than 150,000 copies sold.

== Music video ==
The director of the music video for "Sex on Fire" was Sophie Muller. In the video, the band is seen playing in a room at an abandoned factory. Other scenes show Caleb's brothers holding Caleb, who is tied to a mattress; Nathan washing his hair in a black water tub; Matthew explaining to Nathan and Jared about Caleb, and eating a chicken wing; and Caleb looking at strange shadows while lying on a soft mattress. At the end of the video, Caleb opens his mouth and smoke starts coming out of it.

== Cover versions ==
In 2010, British singer-songwriter Tina Cousins released a dance version of the song. In 2011, American singer Beyoncé performed a cover of the song during her historic headlining 2011 Glastonbury Festival Performance to much acclaim.

A Dutch-language carnival parody titled "Sex Met Die Kale" (lit. 'Sex With That Bald Guy') was released by Lawineboys and DJ Jerome in 2010. It was certified Platinum in the Netherlands in 2025.

== Track listings ==
7-inch vinyl

1. "Sex on Fire"
2. "Beneath the Surface"

CD single

1. "Sex on Fire"
2. "Knocked Up" (Live @ Oxegen '08)

== Charts ==
=== Weekly charts ===
Chart (2008–2013)	Peak position
Australia (ARIA)	1
Austria (Ö3 Austria Top 40)	29
Belgium (Ultratop 50 Flanders)	2
Canada Hot 100 (Billboard)	22
Canada Rock (Billboard)	1
Czech Republic Modern Rock (IFPI)	2
Denmark (Tracklisten)	3
European Hot 100 (Billboard)	6
Finland (Suomen virallinen lista)	1
France (SNEP)	169
Germany (GfK)	33
Ireland (IRMA)	1
Mexico Anglo (Monitor Latino)	9
Mexico Ingles Airplay (Billboard)	2
Netherlands (Dutch Top 40)	29
Netherlands (Single Top 100)	16
New Zealand (Recorded Music NZ)	2
Scottish Singles Sales (Official Charts)	2
Slovakia Airplay (ČNS IFPI)	60
Sweden (Sverigetopplistan)	16
Switzerland (Schweizer Hitparade)	54
UK Singles (Official Charts)	1
US Billboard Hot 100	56
US Adult Alternative Airplay (Billboard)	15
US Adult Pop Airplay (Billboard)	18
US Alternative Airplay (Billboard)	1
US Hot Rock & Alternative Songs (Billboard)	10

Chart (2024–2026)	Peak position
Finland Airplay (Radiosoittolista)	93
Germany Airplay (BVMI)	100
Global 200 (Billboard)	170
Portugal (AFP)	150

=== Year-end charts ===
Chart (2008)	Position
Australia (ARIA)	5
Belgium (Ultratop 50 Flanders)	54
European Hot 100 (Billboard)	47
Ireland (IRMA)	12
Netherlands (Single Top 100)	83
New Zealand (RIANZ)	15
UK Singles (OCC)	7

Chart (2009)	Position
European Hot 100 (Billboard)	98
Netherlands (Single Top 100)	72
Sweden (Sverigetopplistan)	58
UK Singles (OCC)	18
US Hot Rock Songs (Billboard)	4

Chart (2022)	Position
Australia (ARIA)	87

Chart (2023)	Position
Australia (ARIA)	86
UK Singles (OCC)	100

Chart (2024)	Position
Australia (ARIA)	63
UK Singles (OCC)	70

Chart (2025)	Position
UK Singles (OCC)	89

=== Decade-end charts ===
Chart (2000–2009)	Position
Australia (ARIA)	9
UK Singles (OCC)	14

== Certifications ==
Region	Certification	Certified units/sales
Australia (ARIA)	16× Platinum	1,120,000^{‡}
Austria (IFPI Austria)	Platinum	30,000^{*}
Belgium (BRMA)	Platinum	
Denmark (IFPI Danmark)	3× Platinum	270,000^{‡}
Finland (Musiikkituottajat)	Gold	6,752
Germany (BVMI)	3× Platinum	900,000^{‡}
Italy (FIMI)	Platinum	50,000^{‡}
Mexico (AMPROFON)	Diamond+3× Platinum+Gold	510,000^{‡}
New Zealand (RMNZ)	11× Platinum	330,000^{‡}
Portugal (AFP)	4× Platinum	40,000^{‡}
Spain (Promusicae)	2× Platinum	120,000^{‡}
Sweden (GLF)	Gold	10,000^{‡}
United Kingdom (BPI)	8× Platinum	4,800,000^{‡}
United States (RIAA)	Platinum	1,000,000^{*}
^{*} Sales figures based on certification alone.^{‡} Sales+streaming figures based on certification alone.

== Release history ==
Region	Date	Format(s)	Label(s)	Ref(s).
United States	August 11, 2008	Modern rock radio	RCA	
United States	August 2008	Digital download	RCA	
United Kingdom	September 8, 2008	Digital download	Hand Me Down	
United Kingdom	September 15, 2008	7-inch vinyl; CD	Hand Me Down	
Australia	September 20, 2008	Maxi-CD	Sony Music Australia	
United States	March 24, 2009	Contemporary hit radio	RCA	
United States	November 19, 2009	Contemporary hit radio	RCA	

== See also ==
- List of best-selling singles in Australia
