= Give 'Em All a Big Fat Lip =

Studio album by The Whigs
- Released: November 11, 2005
- Genre: Indie rock, garage rock, alternative rock
- Length: 42.8 minutes
- Label: ATO Records

The Whigs chronology
Give 'Em All a Big Fat Lip (2005)	Mission Control (2008)

Professional ratings
Review scores
Source	Rating
AllMusic	link
Spin	link

Give 'Em All a Big Fat Lip is the debut album from The Whigs. It was originally released independently and re-released by ATO Records after they signed the group.

In a review for AllMusic, Hal Horowitz wrote: “Despite the rather aggressive title and cover art, there are more midtempo ballads than rockers, and the tone of the disc falls on the melancholy side. The sound is full without being slick.”

== Track listing ==
1. "Nothing is Easy" – 4:02
2. "Can't Hear You Coming" – 2:13
3. "Technology" – 3:42
4. "Written Invitation" – 2:32
5. "Don't Talk Anymore" – 2:46
6. "Violet Furs" – 3:33
7. "Half the World Away" – 4:46
8. "O.K., Alright" – 3:28
9. "Say Hello" – 5:30
10. "Give 'Em All A Big Fat Lip" – 3:27
11. "All My Banks" – 6:58

== Performers ==
- Parker Gispert – guitar, lead vocals
- Hank Sullivant – bass guitar, vocals
- Julian Dorio – drums
