= Victor Matthews =

Victor Matthews may refer to:

- Victor Matthews, Baron Matthews (1919–1995), newspaper proprietor
- Victor H. Matthews (born 1950), Old Testament scholar
- Victor J. Matthews (1941–2004), classical scholar
- Victor Matthews (artist) (born 1963), American artist
- Vic Matthews (born 1934), British Olympic hurdler
