= Timothy Deaux =

American musician

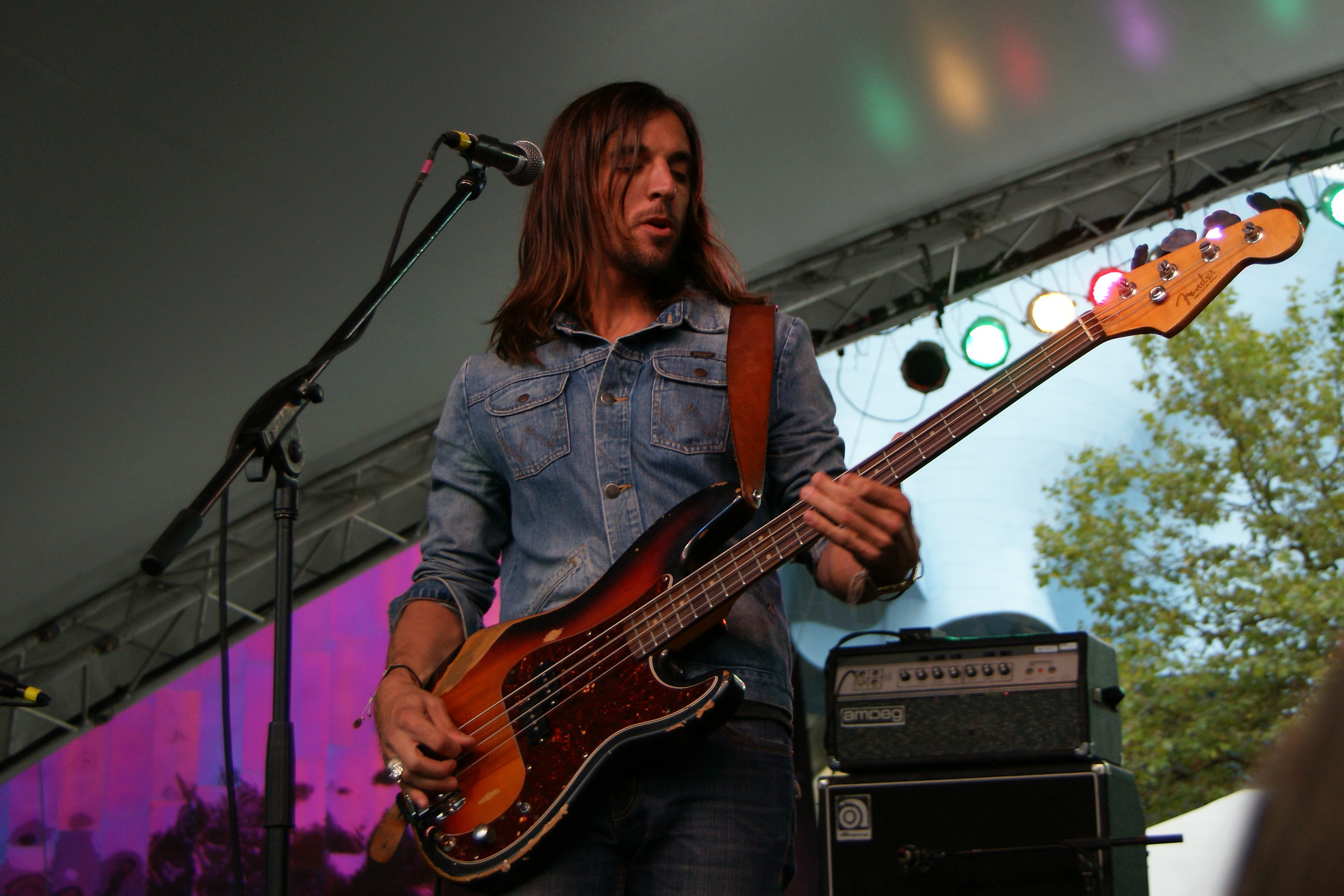
- Deaux with The Whigs at Bumbershoot 2010

Background information
- Born: Mississippi, United States
- Genre: Rock
- Occupations: Songwriter, musician
- Instruments: Guitar, bass, keyboards, percussion
- Years active: 2000 –present
- Labels: ATO, New West, Interscope, Dine Alone

Timothy Deaux is an American songwriter and multi-instrumentalist. Deaux plays bass, guitar and keyboards with The Whigs, bass with Grace Potter, and guitar and percussion with Kings Of Leon. He contributed to albums by Mikky Ekko, Spanish Gold, and Rumba Shaker.

== Discography ==
- In the Dark - The Whigs, 2010
- Enjoy the Company - The Whigs, 2012
- Modern Creation - The Whigs, 2014
- South of Nowhere - Spanish Gold, 2014
- Rumba Shaker - Rumba Shaker, 2015
- Live in Little Five (Live) - The Whigs, 2016
- Fame - Mikky Ekko, 2018
