= Gispert (surname) =

Gispert is a surname. Notable people with the surname include:

- Enric Gispert, choral conductor and director of Ars Musicae de Barcelona
- Luis Gispert (born 1972), American sculptor and photographer
- Núria de Gispert (born 1949), politician and lawyer
- Parker Gispert (born 1982), lead singer of the Whigs
- A. S. Gispert, one of the original members of the Hash House Harriers
