= Go! Push Pops =

Feminist art collective

- Education: School of Visual Arts
- Known for: Feminist art, ecofeminist art
- Notable work: Block Watching Remix, Bad Bitches, 500,000
- Movement: Transnational feminism, Goddess movement, hip hop feminism
- Awards: Culture Push; 2014 Fellowship for Utopian Practice

Go! Push Pops, formally named The Push Pop Collective is a queer, transnational, radical feminist art collective under the direction of Elisa Garcia de la Huerta and Katie Cercone.

== History ==
Go! Push Pops formed in 2010 at the School of Visual Arts (SVA) where both Cercone and Garcia obtained their MFA in 2011. Go! Push Pops studied with Marilyn Minter, Thomas Lanigan-Schmidt, Dan Cameron, Kate Gilmore and Jacqueline Winsor while at SVA. At that time, painter Anna Souvorov (b. 1983 Moscow, Russia) was the third leader of the collective. Go! Push Pops first unofficial performance happened spontaneously during a visit to artist Portia Munson’s “Pink Project” at P.P.O.W. Gallery in Chelsea.

Go! Push Pops have performed at The Brooklyn Museum, The Bronx Museum of the Arts, Maryland Institute College of Art, C24 Gallery, Momenta Art, Apexart, Dixon Place and Cue Art Foundation. Go! Push Pops has been artist-in-residence at Soho20 Chelsea gallery in New York City and Alexandra Arts in Manchester, UK. In 2014, Go! Push Pops was awarded the Culture Push Fellowship for Utopian Practice. Go! Push Pops were a featured artist in Robert Adanto's The F-Word, a documentary about 4th wave feminist art.

=== Influences ===
Go! Push Pops work is contemporary performance art from a standpoint of embodied feminist pedagogy grounded in the spiritual principles of ecofeminist art and can be connected to the Goddess movement The work is characteristically sex-positive. Their work references the Feminist art movement, Dada, Fluxus, Neo-Burlesque, Shamanism, Hip-hop feminism, Culture jamming, Riot grrrl, Queercore and American popular culture. As a young adult, Push Pop co-leader Katie Cercone interned at Bitch where she was introduced to Third-wave feminism and its critique of popular culture. Go! Push Pops also name the artist Narcissister as an important influence and have appeared as Narcissister "sisters" in shows at the New Museum, The Kitchen, Envoy enterprises and The Hole.

==== About the work ====
Go! Push Pops' performance work is collaborative in nature and socially engaged. Many of their performances engage elements of hip hop and involve rapping as a form of embodied feminism. In addition to live performances they offer workshops for youth and adults. Glossy 11 x 17 in. Go! Push Pops posters documenting each performance were a classic fixture of their early work. Go! Push Pops often use free items from Materials for the Arts to make their work.

===== Career highlights =====
Go! Push Pops broke into the Bushwick, Brooklyn performance art scene with their seven-hour durational performance “Gone Wild” during Bushwick Beta Spaces 2010. Go! Push Pops “Push Porn,” a 13-minute lesbian gangsta erotica film, premiered during Bushwick Open Studios 2011 inside a barbershop on Wilson Avenue.

In 2011, Go! Push Pops performed Block Watching Remix at the Moore St. Market in a show curated by Michelle Lopez during Bushwick Open Studios remixing found footage of Luis Gispert's original 2002 Block Watching video. In 2013, Luis Gispert invited Go! Push Pops to perform Block Watching Remix during the Brooklyn Museum's Annual Artist Ball. Go! Push Pops also performed a piece called Bad Bitches, a collaboration with Michelle Marie Charles. Bad Bitches was performed in the center of Luis Gispert’s sculptural Jamaican sound system the Brooklyn Museum commissioned for the party and referenced the glitzy black power aesthetic of Mickalene Thomas, commercial rap music and nudity as a feminist protest tactic used by groups such as FEMEN.

In early 2012 at The Frontrunner gallery in Soho, Go! Push Pops collaborated with painter Bryn McConnell in a performance called "Girlesque," featured in Bomb (magazine). Also In 2012, Go! Push Pops performed “Bulimic Flow,” a yoga hip hop fusion featuring TLC (group)’s lyric “crazy sexy cool” as Mantra. A collaboration with Andrae Hinds, Bulimic Flow happened during Amy Smith Stewart’s exhibition CAMPAIGN at C24 Gallery In the spring of 2013, Go! Push Pops were invited to Baltimore by the Maryland Institute College of Art where they performed with BoomBoxBoy (the rap artist Prince Harvey known for secretly recording his entire PHATASS album in the Apple Store), in a nomadic work that moved through local businesses of the Baltimore Arts District.

In Fall of 2013, Go! Push Pops performed “QUEEN$ DOMiN8TiN” in collaboration with Untitled Queen at The Bronx Museum of the Arts. In 2013, Go! Push Pops performed for Art in Odd Places Festival for which they collaborated with Meg Welch on a piece about inter-military rape called “500,000.” Go! Push Pops was instrumental in organizing "The Clitney Perennial" performative feminist protest at the Whitney Museum of American Art during the Whitney Biennial in 2014. In 2015, Go! Push Pops organized a spirit animal workshop and parade during Roppongi Art Night in Tokyo, Japan, as featured in The Japan Times. Go! Push Pops was part of the first ever BUOY R&R in Deep River Connecticut organized by the feminist art duo BUOY along with artists such as India Menuez.
