= What a Time to Be Alive (disambiguation) =

What a Time to Be Alive is a 2015 mixtape by Drake and Future.

What a Time to Be Alive may also refer to:

- What a Time to Be Alive (Superchunk album), 2018, or the title song
- What a Time to Be Alive (Tom Walker album), 2019
- What a Time to Be Alive (The Lone Bellow album), 2026, or the title song
- "What a Time to Be Alive", song by Ryan Joseph Burns from Anna and the Apocalypse
