= Hank Sullivant =

American musician (born 1983)

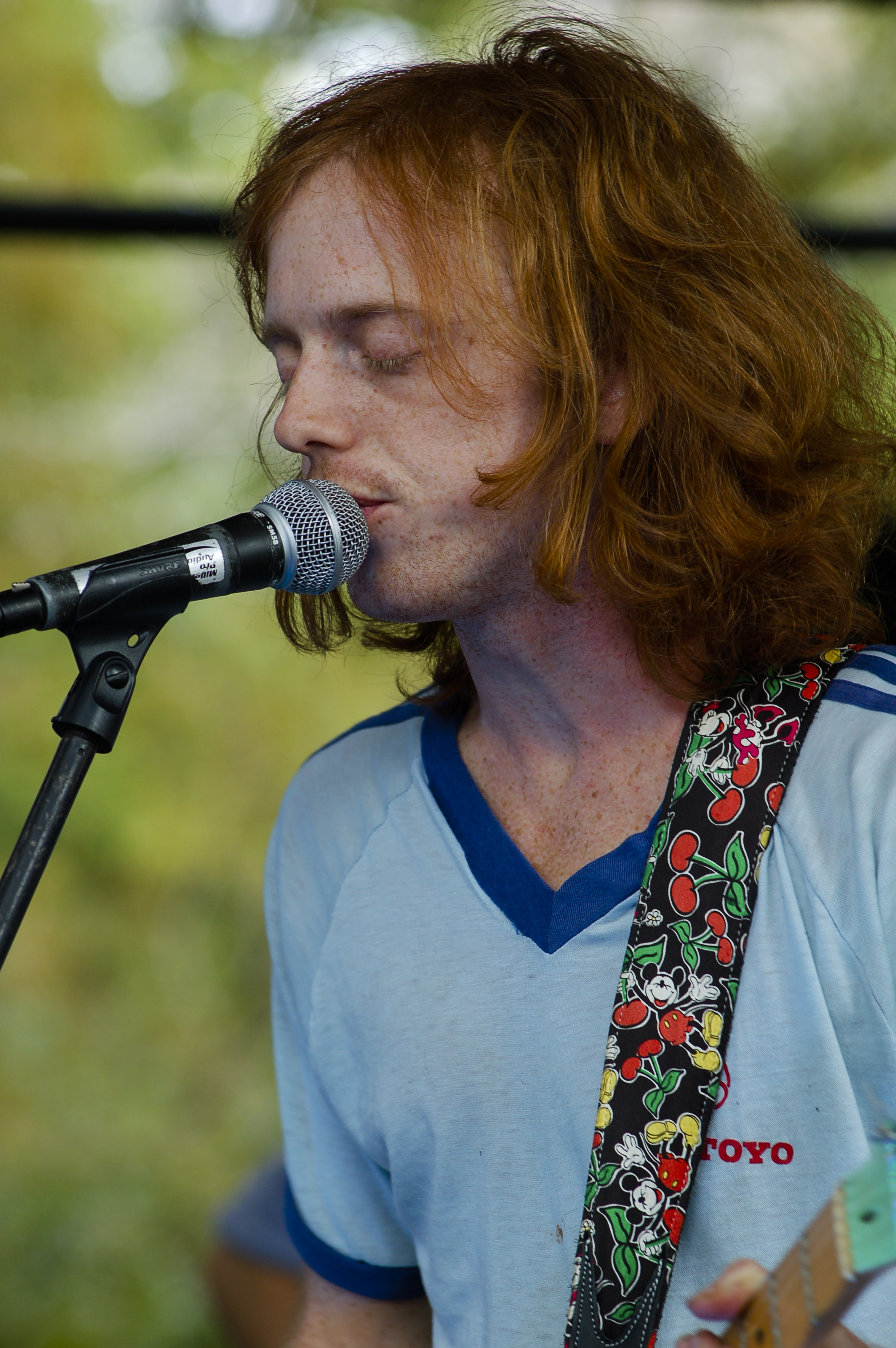
Sullivant with MGMT in 2007

Hank Sullivant (born February 3, 1983) is an American rock musician and record producer, who is known for his work as a co-founder of the Athens-based pop rock band The Whigs, his stint as touring guitarist for MGMT, and as leader of the rock band Kuroma.

== Memphis and Accidental Mersh ==
Sullivant was raised in Memphis, Tennessee and attended high school at Memphis University School. He is listed as one of the school's notable alumni alongside Big Star's Chris Bell and the FedEx CEO Fred Smith. Sullivant played in a band called Accidental Mersh with Andrew VanWyngarden, Nick Robbins, and Charlie Gerber. The band wrote funky pop songs that were inspired by the 1990s Memphis rock band Big Ass Truck. The group packed Memphis clubs like the New Daisy Theater on Beale Street. The group dispersed to different colleges in 2001.

== Athens and The Whigs ==
During his first year at The University of Georgia, Sullivant met Atlantans Parker Gispert and Julian Dorio with whom he formed The Whigs. Sullivant, a guitarist, picked up bass to round out the band. Sullivant and Gispert co-wrote the songs with additional creative input from Dorio. During their time at UGA, the band rose to popularity in Athens and Atlanta.

After delays and a “demoralizing development deal with RCA,” The Whigs self-recorded their debut album Give ‘Em All a Big Fat Lip in an abandoned fraternity house with engineer Billy Bennett in the summer of 2005. In addition to bass, Sullivant played organ, piano, slide guitar, and acoustic guitar on the album. “Half The World Away” features a guitar solo by Sullivant. This solo was a noted climactic point in the Whigs’ live set.

Energized by the production of G’EAaBFL, Sullivant experienced a period of creativity before the album’s release that resulted in most of the songs found on Kuroma’s 2007 debut, Paris. The Whigs self-released their album in November of 2005. Rolling Stone Magazine named them one of the ‘Ten Bands To Watch In 2006.’ The Whigs signed to ATO Records in July 2006 & toured through November. Sullivant then left the band to work solely on his own music.

== Paris ==
The recording of Kuroma’s debut album Paris began shortly after Sullivant quit the Whigs. He asked childhood friend, and multi-instrumentalist, James Richardson to collaborate on most of the sessions. In March 2007, Sullivant and Richardson, with Billy Bennett engineering and co-producing, tracked the bulk of Paris at Chase Park Transduction in Athens. The final product was mastered in April 2007. Sullivant came up with the name 'Kuroma' during this time. Nick Robbins, Kyle Spence, and John Mills also appear on the album.

== MGMT ==
Following the recording of Paris, Andrew VanWyngarden asked Sullivant to play guitar in MGMT’s live band. MGMT had signed to Columbia Records, and they were recording Oracular Spectacular when they contacted Sullivant. He moved to New York for rehearsals in May 2007 but planned to return to Kuroma. Sullivant stayed through the official release of Oracular Spectacular and returned to Athens after the South by Southwest festival in March 2008. He performed on the Late Show with David Letterman and the BBC's Later... with Jools Holland with MGMT. He also played on tours with Of Montreal, Fiery Furnaces, and Yeasayer, and played MGMT’s first overseas dates in the UK and Europe. He left the band in 2008 and was replaced by guitarist James Richardson and Will Berman who plays drums. He rejoined MGMT in 2013 and toured with the band until 2016.

== Kuroma ==
=== Beginnings and live performances ===
Upon returning to Kuroma in 2008, Sullivant originally opted to have no personalized web presence, (MySpace, Facebook, or band website) but managed to get Kuroma reviewed in print and Internet magazines. His initial reticence stemmed from a sense of revulsion at the marketing of music and bands. Sullivant says that Paris’s sound was primarily influenced by the Love, Peace, and Poetry compilation series of obscure international 60s psychedelic music. Paris received good reviews, and the live band was praised early on by NME and Spin Magazine. In 2008/2009, the band opened for Jarvis Cocker, Primal Scream, MGMT, and The Walkmen, and performed at the 2009 Bonnaroo festival.

=== “Transmutilation” and performance art ===
In February 2009 Sullivant and fellow UGA graduate Alejandro Crawford put on a performance art show at Athens Cine entitled “Homeopathic Grafting: This Awakening Dream of Communication.” The title is a direct quote from Jean Baudrillard’s Simulacra and Simulation. Crawford, a poet and visual artist, identifies “Transmutilation” as the technique behind his long-form poem Morpheau. In a video interview in 2009 Sullivant describes Kuroma’s music as “transmutilation.”

In November 2008, Kuroma put on a two-part performance at The Georgia Theatre. Pt. 1 featured a 15-minute cover of Spacemen 3’s "Big City", the intermission was a screening of the late 1960s psychedelic art film The Invasion of Thunderbolt Pagoda; and Pt. 2 was a set of Kuroma songs. Formal playbills were passed at the door.

=== Single and video releases ===
Green Label Sound, a one-off video/single label funded by Pepsi/Mountain Dew, approached Kuroma in early 2009. Sullivant submitted "In New York Everything Is Tropical", a song he describes as soulless. Sullivant elaborates, “There’s a celebratory part of the song, but also a cynicism, and when you combine both of them, you’re left with nothing.” In contrast to the quiet release of Paris, GLS heavily promoted the single, and the video itself shows a barrage of graphics on top of rapid-fire shots of Sullivant walking overconfidently through famous sections of New York, including the Marcy Projects and the financial district. During the publicity run, Sullivant hosted MTV2’s Subterranean, and MTV2 routinely played the video for two months.

Sullivant identifies Kuroma’s following video/single "Get The Gunz" as a companion to "In New York Everything Is Tropical". Directed collaboratively with Ash Sechler, the video features Sullivant dancing in rollerblades, stabbing water, suggestively being curbed and killing himself and his bandmates with cartoon-like special effects as the blood.

=== Psychopomp ===
Sullivant, Joaquin Cotler, Alfredo Lapuz, and Nick Robbins tracked songs for Kuroma’s second album, Psychopomp, at Chase Park Transduction in December 2009. Eric Gorman, a mixing engineer from New York, co-produced with Sullivant. The songs were mixed at Echo Mountain Recording in Asheville, North Carolina, in February 2010. Psychopomp was released on iTunes in October 2010 before Kuroma’s fall tours with MGMT and Tame Impala. The 8 minute track "Get Quick Got It" was licensed for a Cinemax movie advertisement in February 2011. The lineup for the album consisted of Sullivant on guitar, Lapuz on keyboards and synth bass, Robbins on drums, and Stan Walker on synths.

=== 2013 ===
As of 2013, Kuroma’s lineup was Sullivant, Simon O'Connor, James Richardson and Will Berman. The band made its third album, Kuromarama, produced by Ben Goldwasser of MGMT, and opened for MGMT on its North America tour in the spring of 2013. Sullivant filled in on guitar at several summer festivals for MGMT’s Andrew VanWyngarden, who was recovering from shoulder surgery. He subsequently rejoined MGMT full-time and, simultaneously, performed with Kuroma, touring during the album cycle for MGMT’s self-titled third studio album, MGMT, in 2014. He left the band again in 2016.
