= Frontrunner Collective =

New York City-based art collective

Frontrunner is a contemporary art collective based in New York City “with an ongoing dedication to supporting emerging artists”. Frontrunner was founded in the Fall of 2009. Beginning as an online magazine in order to feature the creative work of friends, the collective expanded into a physical art gallery space on Franklin Street in TriBeCa in 2010. The storefront space was divided to allow for studios for working artists in the back and a front room devoted to exhibitions of all types.

During the Occupy Wall Street movement, Frontrunner held an art exhibition, Faces of Occupy Wall Street, that included street portraits of protestors by artist Andrew Piccone. The gallery was criticized for trying to profit from the protests.

The gallery curates fully immersive exhibitions as well as offering shows to relatively unknown artists with a range of talents including queer, transnational, radical feminist art collective Go! Push Pops who performed by cutting off their clothes and aggressively smearing lipstick all over each other. Andre Woolery created a new form of painting composed entirely of thousands of color thumbtacks in his first solo exhibition, Bruised Thumbs.

Corinne Beardsley's The Cave included over 20 artists, performers, musicians, and “essences of the cave". Many of the participants were from Beardsley's alma mater the neighboring New York Academy of Art. The Cave was built of cardboard, wheat pasted newsprint covered in India ink drawings, and filled with robotic rats, sculptural stalactites, and a “birthing canal”.

Frontrunner continued to present exhibitions, performances and special events until 2012. The final show, The ChiBeCa Project by fine art photographer Leah Overstreet inspired yet another real estate subdividing of Lower Manhattan and renaming of the blocks between TriBeCa, Chinatown, and Federal Plaza. The show consisted of black and white portraits in Cortlandt Alley of the neighborhood's chefs, shoe repairman, and artists including Ross Bleckner, Casey Neistat, and Victor Matthews.
