= The Lone Bellow (album) =

Studio album by The Lone Bellow
- Released: January 22, 2013
- Genres: Alternative country; country rock; folk rock; indie folk; indie rock
- Length: 46:50
- Label: Descendant
- Producer: Charlie Peacock

The Lone Bellow chronology
| The Lone Bellow (2013) | Then Came the Morning (2015) |

The Lone Bellow is the debut studio album by the American folk rock trio The Lone Bellow. The album was released on January 22, 2013 by Descendant Records label, and the producer on the album was Charlie Peacock. The album has achieved critical and commercial acclaim.

== Music and lyrics ==
The trio sing songs that have been described as being in the following genres: alt-country, alternative rock, blues, country rock, folk rock, indie folk, indie rock, pop rock, roots rock, soul.

== Critical reception ==
Professional ratings
Aggregate scores
| Source | Rating |
|---|---|
| Metacritic | 79/100 |
Review scores
| Source | Rating |
| AllMusic | 4/5 stars |
| Glide Magazine | 7/10 stars |
| Paste | 9.4/10 |
| PopMatters | 7/10 discs |
| Rolling Stone | 3/5 stars |
| Roughstock | 5/5 stars |
| Tampa Bay Times | A |
| USA Today | 3/4 stars |

The Lone Bellow has received mostly positive and favorable reviews from the critics. At Metacritic, they assign a weighted average score to reviews and ratings from mainstream music critics, which the Metascore earned for this release is 79 out of 100. Allmusic's Steve Leggett called the album "a gem" that is "full of haunting, passionate songs that breathe with country soul and a kind of autumnal grace", which this "solid debut, made by a band that arrives fully formed and has a great future." Brian Palmer of Glide Magazine noted that the band is "making some waves" with their new album, which he evoked that the album "will soothe your soul or help you drown your sorrows, depending on your preference", and told that "either choice sound[s] appealing and you’ll want to experience it again and again." Holly Gleason of Paste found that "working with producer Charlie Peacock, The Lone Bellow figured out a way to harness the acoustic-rock template being mined by Mumford & Sons, The Lumineers and The Civil Wars and add a sense of powerful vocal incandescence. If Fleetwood Mac shimmered more, rocked less and were organic without being raw, that might suggest the level of evocative language and romance The Lone Bellow exudes." Roughstock's Matt Bjorke alluded to how "The trio's earthy harmonies drive their sound and while the comparisons to popular rootsy folk bands like Mumford & Sons, The Lumineers, Needtobreathe and The Civil Wars are obvious, The Lone Bellow showcases throughout this fantastic self-titled album an ability to bridge the trend of the moment with a more wholesome, heartland sensibility that could and should lend the band to the ears of mainstream Country Music fans." Conversely, Jon Dolan of Rolling Stone claimed that "anyone expecting funny-bearded fiddle jams about artisanal pickles might be disappointed. The trio shape folk, gospel and blues influences into straight-ahead roots rock somewhere between the Lumineers and Lady Antebellum." Jerry Shriver of USA Today proclaimed that the album is "Passionate and self-assured, this trio's debut treads a middle ground between Mumford bombast and neo-folkie navel gazing" that has "a rootsy brew flavored with close harmonies and light on hipster pretension." At PopMatters, Steve Leftridge highlighted that some may criticize the effort because it may seem a bit "sounding trend derivative", which he found the album "simply too good to need any qualifying", and this led him to note that it's hard "to knock and the year's Americana debut to beat."

== Commercial performance ==
The album charted at No. 64 on the Billboard 200, as well as placing at No. 14 (Alternative albums), No. 12 (Folk albums), No. 10 (Independent albums), No. 20 (Rock albums) and No. 58 (Current albums).

== Track listing ==
All tracks are written by Zach Williams except where noted.

The Lone Bellow track listing
| No. | Title | Writer(s) | Length |
|---|---|---|---|
| 1. | "Green Eyes and a Heart of Gold" | Brian Elmquist | 4:14 |
| 2. | "Tree to Grow" | | 5:01 |
| 3. | "Two Sides of Lonely" | | 4:35 |
| 4. | "You Never Need Nobody" | Sam Ashworth | 4:50 |
| 5. | "You Can Be All Kinds of Emotional" | | 3:20 |
| 6. | "You Don't Love Me Like You Used To" | Elmquist, Trisha Ivy, Matt Knapp, Kanene Doheney Pipkin | 3:15 |
| 7. | "Fire Red Horse" | | 3:53 |
| 8. | "Bleeding Out" | Elmquist, Knapp, Charlie Peacock | 3:41 |
| 9. | "Looking for You" | Matthew Perryman Jones | 5:28 |
| 10. | "Teach Me to Know" | Caleb Clardy | 3:29 |
| 11. | "The One You Should've Let Go" | | 5:04 |
| Total length: | | | 46:50 |

iTunes bonus track
| No. | Title | Length |
|---|---|---|
| 12. | "Button" | 3:54 |
| Total length: | | 50:44 |

== Personnel ==
- Zach Williams – guitar, lead vocals, songwriter
- Kanene Doheney Pipkin – mandolin, vocals, songwriter
- Brian Elmquist – guitar, vocals, songwriter
- Ben Mars – upright bass, electric bass
- Brian Murphy – accordion, keyboards, piano
- Matt Knapp – guitar, electric guitar, pedal steel guitar
- Brian Griffin – drums, percussion
- Jason Pipkin – banjo, mandolin
- Andy Leftwich – fiddle, mandolin
- Mark Hill – bass guitar
- Charlie Peacock – engineer, producer, piano, trumpet, Wurlitzer organ
- Jerry McPherson – guitar, electric guitar
- Ken Lewis – percussion
- Eric Ryan Anderson – photography
- Sam Ashworth – engineer, acoustic guitar
- Richie Biggs – engineer, mixing
- Michelle Box – A&R
- Caleb Clardy – songwriter
- Trisha Ivy – songwriter
- Matthew Perryman Jones – songwriter
- Richard Dodd – mastering
- Jessica Evans – art direction, design
- Leanne Ford – wardrobe
- Erin Green – hair stylist, makeup
- Jay Harren – A&R
- James Sweeting – engineer, production coordination, programming
- Tracy Zamot – public relations

== Charts ==
| Chart (2013) | Peak position |
|---|---|
| US Billboard 200 | 64 |
| US Top Alternative Albums (Billboard) | 14 |
| US Folk Albums (Billboard) | 12 |
| US Independent Albums (Billboard) | 10 |
| US Top Rock Albums (Billboard) | 20 |
| US Top Current Albums (Billboard) | 58 |
