= The Lone Bellow =

American band

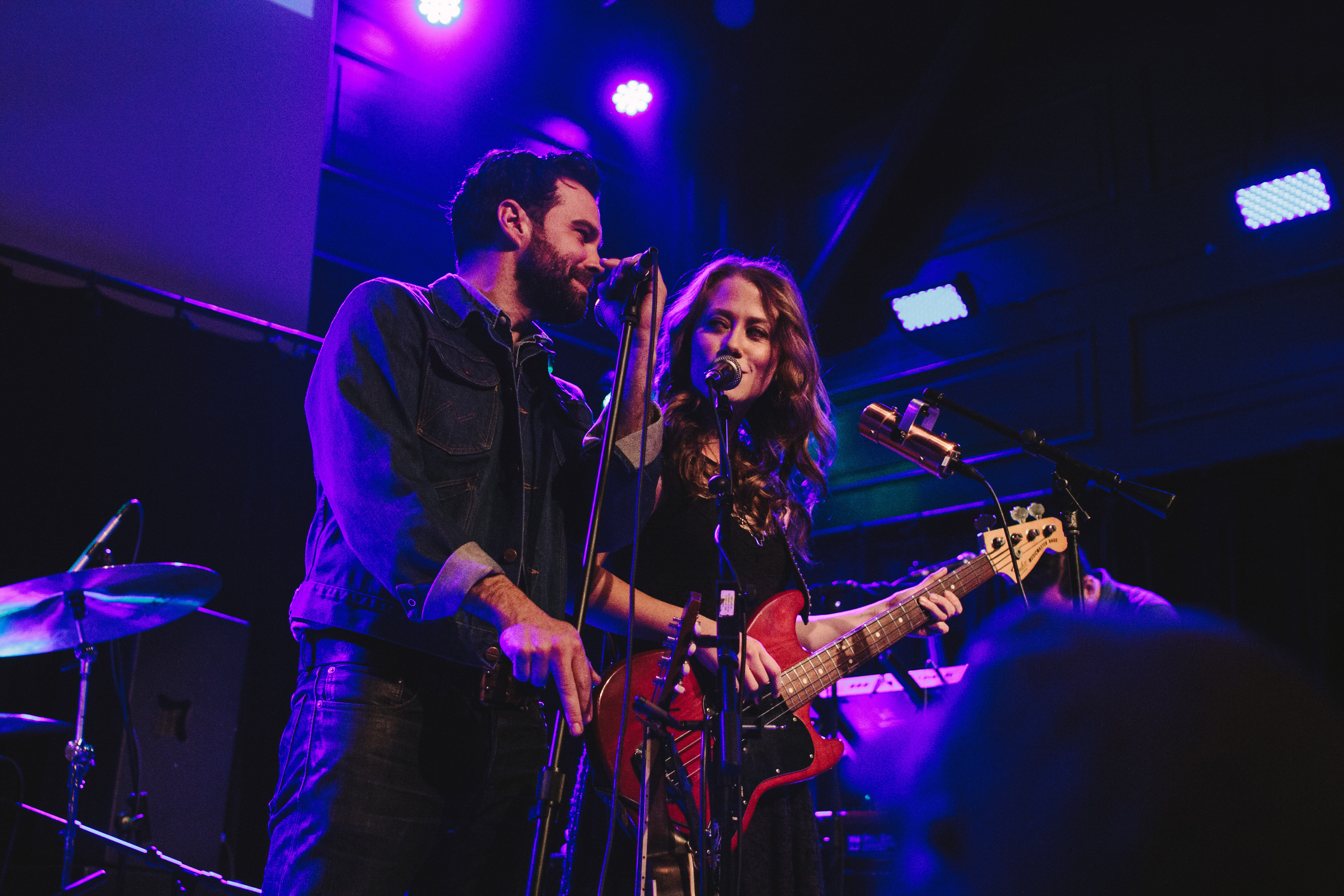

Background information
- Origin: New York City, U.S.
- Genres: Americana, alt-country, indie folk
- Years active: 2011–present
- Labels: Descendant, Sony Masterworks
- Members: Zach Williams; Kanene Donehey Pipkin; Brian Elmquist; Julian Dorio
- Website: thelonebellow.com

The Lone Bellow is an American musical group from Brooklyn, New York City.

== History ==
The Lone Bellow began as a songwriting project for Zach Williams, whose wife had suffered temporary paralysis following a horseback riding accident. During his wife's recovery, Williams coped with the experience by writing in a journal. At the urging of his friends, Williams learned how to play the guitar and turned his journal entries into songs. Following his wife's recovery, the couple moved to New York City.

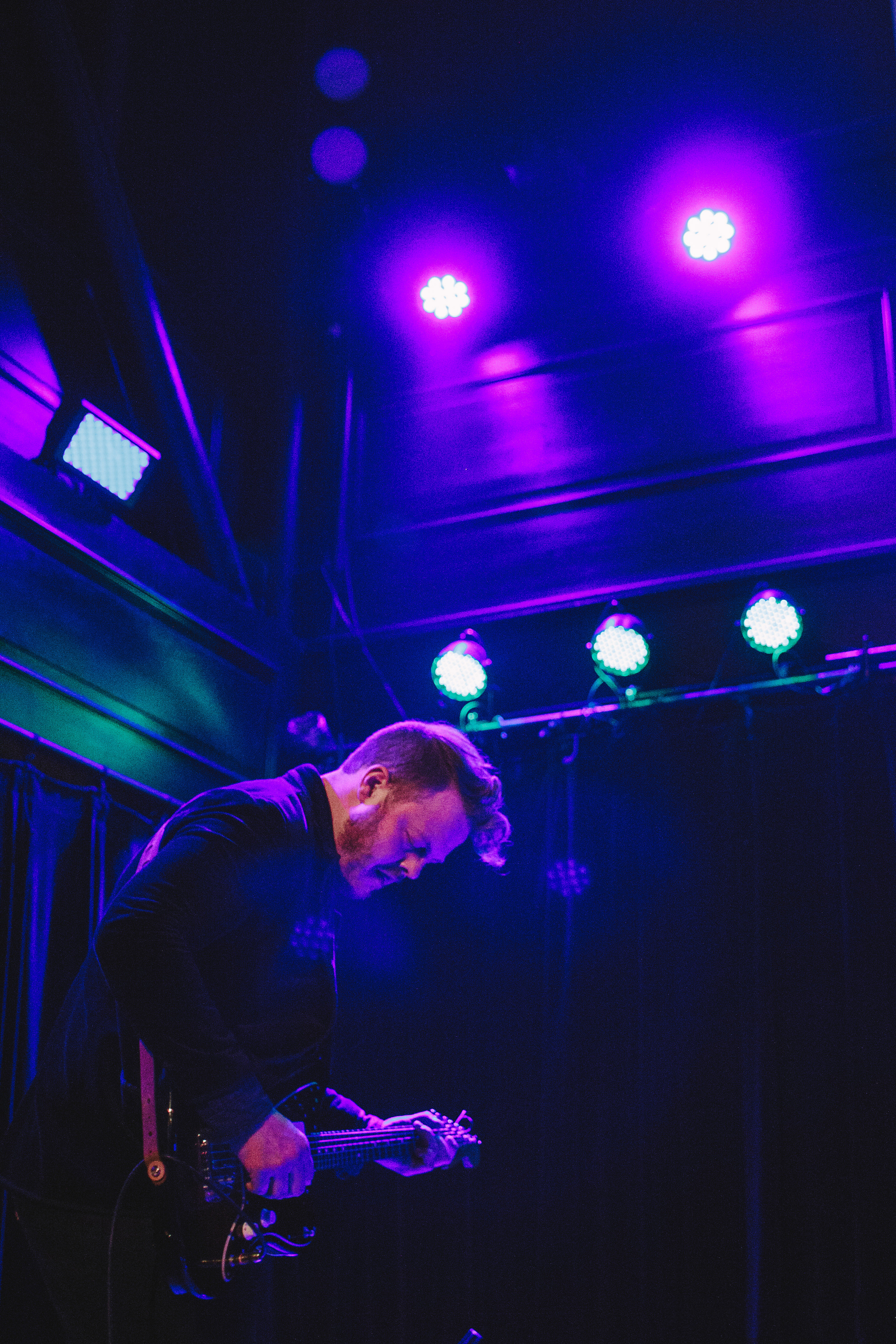
Brian Elmquist

Previously, Williams had been performing as a solo act around Brooklyn and New York City, occasionally being backed by a hired band. Williams recalls when The Lone Bellow's guitarist and old friend, Brian Elmquist met at Dizzy's Diner in Park Slope. Williams invited fellow singer Kanene Pipkin to join them at the diner, and it was then that the trio was initially conceived. Initially known as Zach Williams and the Bellow, the band shortened its name to The Lone Bellow before putting out any official releases. In 2012, the group signed with Descendant Records, a newly formed imprint of Sony Music, and released its self-titled debut, produced by Charlie Peacock, in January 2013. It was recorded at local NYC venue Rockwood Music Hall over the course of three days.

The album appeared at No. 64 on the Billboard 200. People named it No. 8 of the Top 10 Albums of 2013 and Entertainment Weekly said it was "One of the top reasons to love country music in 2013". The album was featured on 10 different Best of 2013 year-end lists.

The band announced in early 2014 that they would be recording a new album with producer Aaron Dessner of The National. The band released the first single from the album, "Then Came the Morning", which premiered on NPR's website on October 6, 2014. The band released a second single, titled "Fake Roses", which premiered on Stereogum on November 3, 2014. The album was released on January 27, 2015. Later in 2015, they toured the UK with Kacey Musgraves and were nominated for an Americana Music Award for Duo/Group of the Year on the strength of their album. In early 2016 the band members relocated to Nashville.

In 2017, Descendant Records partnered with Sony Masterworks to release the band's third album, Walk Into a Storm, recorded at the RCA Studio A in Nashville, produced by Dave Cobb and released on September 15, 2017. In 2020, the group released their second album with Dessner, Half Moon Light. Their fifth studio album, Love Songs for Losers, was released on November 4, 2022.

In November 2025, the Lone Bellow announced their sixth studio album, What a Time to Be Alive, set for release on February 13, 2026.

== Members ==
- Zach Williams – guitar, lead vocals
- Kanene Donehey Pipkin – mandolin, bass, keyboard, vocals
- Brian Elmquist – guitar, vocals
- Julian Dorio - drums

The trio are regularly accompanied on bass and keyboards by Pipkin's husband Jason, who has also contributed to the band's songwriting.

== Discography ==
=== Albums ===
Title	Album details	Peak chart positions				
Title	Album details	US	US Alt	US Folk	US Rock	UK
The Lone Bellow	Released: January 22, 2013; Label: Descendant; Formats: CD, LP, digital download	64	13	5	19	—
Then Came the Morning	Released: January 27, 2015; Label: Descendant; Formats: CD, LP, digital download	44	6	5	11	176
Walk Into a Storm	Released: September 15, 2017; Label: Descendant, Sony Masterworks; Formats: CD, LP, digital download	173	—	8	41	—
Half Moon Light	Released: February 7, 2020; Label: Dualtone; Formats: CD, LP, digital download	173	—	4	26	—
Love Songs for Losers	Released: November 4, 2022; Label: Dualtone; Formats: CD, LP, digital download	—	—	—	—	—
What a Time to Be Alive	Released: February 13, 2026; Label: Burly Bellow Music, Soundly Music; Formats: CD, LP, digital download					

=== Singles ===
Title	Year	Peak chart positions	Album
Title	Year	US AAA	Album
"Bleeding Out"	2013	17	The Lone Bellow
"Then Came the Morning"	2014	17	Then Came the Morning
"Fake Roses"	2014	—	Then Came the Morning
"Take My Love"	2015	21	Then Came the Morning
"Time's Always Leaving"	2017	25	Walk Into a Storm
"Count on Me"	2019	15	Half Moon Light
"Good Times"	2020	27	Half Moon Light
"Dried Up River"	2021	31	Non-album single
"Honey"	2022	7	Love Songs for Losers
"Gold"	2022	38	Love Songs for Losers
"Homesick"	2022	—	Love Songs for Losers
"I Did It For Love"	2026	38	What a Time To Be Alive
"—" denotes singles that did not chart or were not released
