= La Garriga =

- Municipality
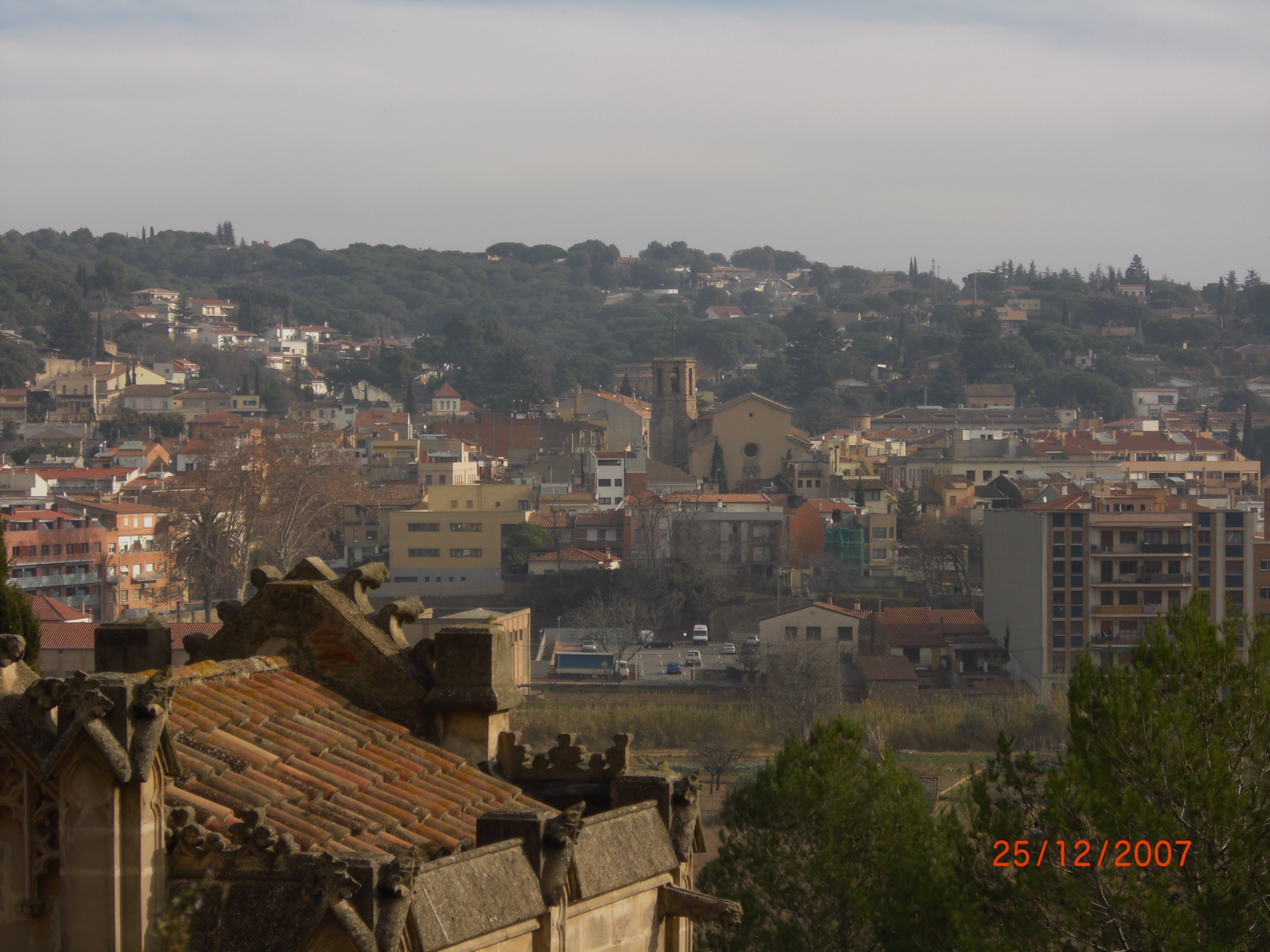

- Coat of arms

- Location in Catalonia La Garriga (Spain)
- Coordinates: 41°41′N 2°17′E
- Country: Spain
- Community: Catalonia
- Province: Barcelona
- Comarca: Vallès Oriental

Government
  - Mayor: Meritxell Budó (2023) (Junts)

Area
  - Total: 18.8 km^{2} (7.3 sq mi)

Population (2025-01-01)
  - Total: 17,426
  - Density: 927/km^{2} (2,400/sq mi)
- Website: www.lagarriga.cat

La Garriga (Catalan pronunciation: [lə ɣəˈriɣə]) is a municipality in the province of Barcelona and autonomous community of Catalonia, Spain. The municipality covers an area of 18.8 square kilometres (7.3 sq mi) and the population in 2014 was 15,762.

== Notable natives and residents ==
- The Catalan missionary priest in Cameroon Jordi Mas Castells was born here in 1930 and he died here in 2010. In 2008, the town council in La Garriga honoured him as Illustrious Citizen.
- The New York–based sculptor, Ester Partegàs, was born here in 1972.

== Bibliography ==
- (in Catalan) Lapuerta, Montserrat (2009). Retrats de Garriguencs Il·lustres (in Catalan). El Garbell. ISBN 978-84-613-6776-4.
