= The Whigs (band) =

American rock band

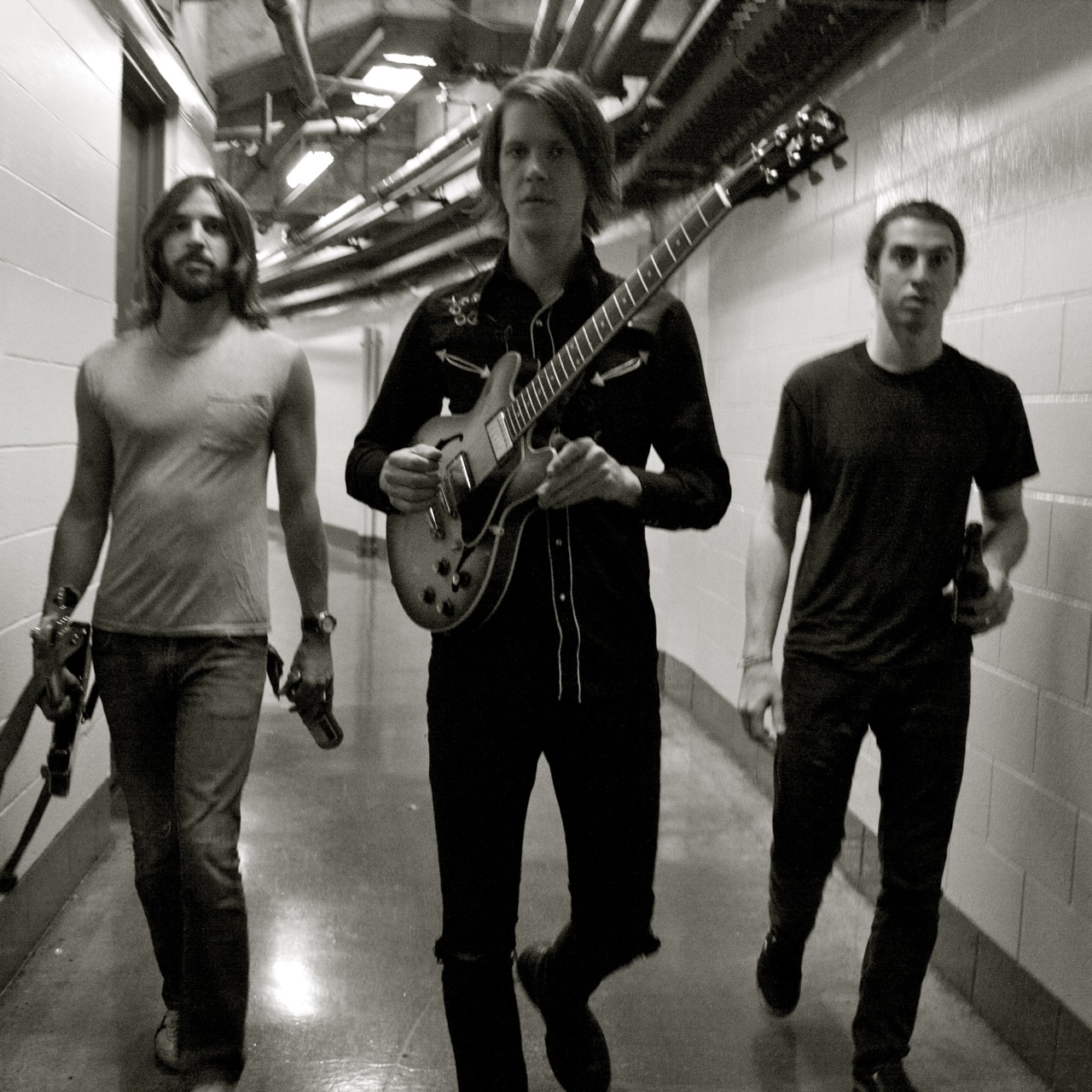
- The Whigs in 2009

Background information
- Origin: Athens, Georgia, United States
- Genre: Garage rock revival
- Years active: 2002–present
- Labels: ATO; MapleMusic Recordings (Canada); Kartel (UK & ) New West (US)
- Members: Parker Gispert; Julian Dorio; Timothy Deaux
- Past members: Hank Sullivant
- Website: TheWhigs.com

The Whigs are an American garage rock band from Athens, Georgia, consisting of lead singer and guitarist Parker Gispert, drummer Julian Dorio and bassist Timothy Deaux.

== Biography ==
Formed in Athens, Georgia in 2002, The Whigs have released five studio albums and have toured the world with acts such as Kings of Leon, The Black Keys, Black Rebel Motorcycle Club, Drive-By Truckers, The Hold Steady, Band of Skulls, Dead Confederate, and Wax Fang. They have become Late Night television regulars, having appeared on The Tonight Show with Jay Leno twice, the Late Show with David Letterman four times, Late Night with Conan O'Brien, Late Night with Jimmy Fallon, and Jimmy Kimmel Live! twice.

=== Early days (2002–2004) ===
The band was formed in 2002 by Parker Gispert, Julian Dorio, and original bass player Hank Sullivant. Gispert and Dorio both attended The Westminster Schools in Atlanta together, but didn't start playing together until they were both at the University of Georgia in Athens. After 6 months of playing and writing together, the pair hooked up with Sullivant whom they met through mutual friends.

The trio played their first gig together at the DT's Down Under Club in Athens in May 2002 and started setting up gigs in New York once a month. Soon the band were sharing stages with bands such as Franz Ferdinand, Drive By Truckers and The Killers. Following a negative experience during a "development deal" with major label RCA Records in 2004, the Whigs opted to record and release their first album independently.

=== Give Em All a Big Fat Lip (2005–2006) ===
In July 2005, the band recorded their first album, Give 'Em All a Big Fat Lip at Ross Crane House, a fraternity house in downtown Athens with engineer Billy Bennett. They used equipment purchased on eBay, which they resold after recording was finished to help offset the cost of production. The album was released independently in December 2005 and in April 2006 saw the band described by Rolling Stone Magazine as "perhaps the best unsigned band in America." Following this media exposure, in July 2006, The Whigs were signed to ATO Records by Jonathan Eshak who had earlier seen the band play at the Pianos venue on Ludlow Street in New York, and Give 'Em All a Big Fat Lip was re-released on September 19, 2006.

The band appeared at Summerfest and Voodoo Experience following the re-release of Fat Lip.

Founding member Hank Sullivant left the band in late 2006 to tour with MGMT and later pursue his solo project Kuroma. Both parties remain on good terms as Kuroma supported the band at a show in Athens in 2010 and Sullivant stepped in to play at a show in Memphis.

=== Mission Control (2007–2008) ===
The band's second album Mission Control was recorded at Hollywood's Sunset Sound/Sound Factory during the summer of 2007 with producer Rob Schnapf and the temporary help of bassist Adam "Malicious Gardening" Saunders from local Athens band The Pendletons. In between the recording of the album and its release on January 22, 2008, the band recruited Timothy Deaux. Following the album's release, the band toured the US with Kings of Leon, Black Rebel Motorcycle Club, Tokyo Police Club, Band of Skulls, Wax Fang, Tulsa, Dead Confederate, Jason Isbell, and the Dead Trees. They also appeared at several festivals including Sasquatch!, Bumbershoot and SXSW.

The summer of 2008 marked the band's first European tour, where they performed at Belgium's Rock Werchter Festival, England's 02 Wireless Festival, Scotland's T in the Park Festival and Ireland's Oxygen Festival. The tour also included a performance with Kings of Leon and MGMT at Le Zenith in Paris, France along with stops in Germany and Italy.

Towards the end of 2008 the band toured with Toadies, Tokyo Police Club, The Kooks and Kings of Leon, and ended the year with a New Year's Eve gig in their home state of Georgia with Band of Horses.

The band performed "Right Hand On My Heart" on both The Late Show with David Letterman and Late Night With Conan O'Brien. "Already Young" and "Like A Vibration" were performed on Jimmy Kimmel Live.

=== In the Dark (2009–2011) ===
The band spent 2009 writing new songs for their next album whilst continuing to tour with Kings of Leon and undertaking several headline tours with support from bands such as Dead Confederate, The Features and Trances Arc, featuring Dorio's brother.

In The Dark was released March 16, 2010 in the US by ATO Records. It was recorded primarily at Chase Park Transduction in Athens in Summer 2009 by longtime friend and Athens native Ben H. Allen (Animal Collective, Gnarls Barkley). "Someone's Daughter" and "So Lonely" were re-recorded in the fall of 2009 with producer Jay Joyce. First single "Kill Me Carolyne" and "Automatic" were written and recorded a few days later with Kings Of Leon producer Angelo Petraglia. Both additional sessions took place in Nashville, TN.

The band made their second appearance on the Late Show with David Letterman performing "Kill Me Carolyne" and also appeared on Late Night with Jimmy Fallon where they performed "Hundred / Million".

Later, the band made their first appearance on The Tonight Show with Jay Leno performing "Black Lotus."

Upon the release of In The Dark, the band toured the US alongside Black Rebel Motorcycle Club, Band of Skulls and The Hold Steady and at festivals including Mountain Jam in Woodstock and Outside Lands Festival. The band also undertook several large scale tours with Kings Of Leon in the US and the UK/Europe, including a sold out show in June at London's Hyde Park, with an estimated 65,000 attendance.

In May 2010, the band embarked on a U.S.O tour, performing at military bases in Germany and the UK for soldiers and their families in an attempt to boost morale. The decision to undertake the tour was influenced by the fact the Deaux's father was in the airforce, and therefore lived in numerous countries around the world where his father was stationed.

In June, the Whigs toured England with We Are Scientists and returned in February 2011 to co-headline a tour with Dead Confederate along with some dates in mainland Europe, with whom they share the same label in the UK and Europe, Kartel.

In May 2011, the Whigs returned to the U.K and to perform at Ireland's famed Slane Castle for their 30th anniversary. Here the Whigs opened for Kings of Leon and Thin Lizzy and performed to an estimated 75,000 people.

New Year's Eve 2011, The Whigs headlined the Fabulous 40 Watt Club in Athens, GA. with support from famed Elephant 6'ers Elf Power.

Their 2nd song in there album, Black Lotus is the theme song for MLB Network Countdown, a popular show from back in the day on MLB Network.

=== Enjoy The Company (2012–2013) ===
In the summer of 2012, The Whigs recorded their fourth album (and first for New West records). Enjoy The Company, was released on September 18, and was recorded in Dreamland Recording Studios in Hurley, New York with legendary rock producer John Agnello (Sonic Youth, Dinosaur Jr., Kurt Vile). The album features and opens with live favorite "Staying Alive" which clocks in at over 8 minutes making it the longest Whigs track to date. The album spawned three U.S singles in "Waiting", "Staying Alive", and "Rock And Roll Forever."

A headlining tour of the U.S coincided with the release of "Enjoy The Company" and was opened by former Whig Hank Sullivant's band Kuroma. Also accompanying the album release was a music video for first single "Waiting" directed by legendary music videographer Danny Clinch. Music videos for "Staying Alive" and "Rock and Roll Forever" followed.

That September, The Whigs made their third appearance on The Late Show With David Letterman performing "Waiting."

In October, the band performed "Tiny Treasures" and "Waiting" on Jimmy Kimmel Live.

The Whigs also performed at the Austin City Limits Music Festival for the first time in October 2012.

In January 2013, the Whigs made their second appearance on The Tonight Show with Jay Leno performing a television friendly version of "Staying Alive."

In the summer of 2013, the Whigs co-headlined a short U.S tour with veteran Georgia band Drivin' 'N Cryin' who the band credits as being an early inspiration. The Whigs also opened a short string of shows for Drive-By-Truckers.

=== Modern Creation (2014–Present) ===
On April 22, 2014, The Whigs released their fifth album, Modern Creation to positive reviews. The album consists of ten songs, including the first single "Hit Me," and favors full-band live takes over typical studio effects.

First single "Hit Me" is noted for its music video directed by frequent Whigs collaborator Scott Carney, which features a simulated performance of the band on the BBC's Old Grey Whistle Test.

In May 2014, the Whigs performed "Hit Me" on The Late Show With David Letterman. This was the band's fourth appearance on the program.

The Whigs recently toured the United States and opened for Social Distortion in late 2016.

Lead singer Parker Gispert released a cover of Frank Sinatra's "That's Life" on the Normaltown Records label in October 2019.

== Awards and accomplishments ==
In March 2006 Rolling Stone Magazine named the Whigs one of their 10 Artists to Watch. In September 2006, The Whigs were named "Artist of the Day" by Spin.com. Dorio was awarded an Esky award in March 2007 as "Best Drummer" by Esquire magazine.

It was announced in October 2007 that the band had finished their second album, entitled "Mission Control," which was released on January 22, 2008. The band appeared on the Late Show with David Letterman on January 28, in support of the album. They also appeared on Late Night with Conan O'Brien on February 20, 2008 to promote the album.

The song "Need You Need You", from Mission Control is featured in the video game Pure.

== Discography ==
=== Studio albums ===
- Give 'Em All a Big Fat Lip (2005)
- Mission Control (2008)
- In the Dark (2010)
- Enjoy the Company (2012)
- Modern Creation (2014)

=== Singles ===
- "Like a Vibration" b/w "That's A Lot To Live Up To" (demo) (7", 2008) ATO Records
- "Right Hand on My Heart" (2008) No. 40 Billboard Hot Modern Rock Tracks
- "Kill Me Carolyne" (2010) ATO Records
- "Hundred / Million" (2010) Kartel Records (UK / Euro)
- "So Lonely" (2010) b/w "Gimme Gimme Shock Treatment (The Ramones) Kartel Records (UK / Euro)
- "Waiting" b/w "Don't Know What We're Doing" (7", 2012) New West Records
- "Staying Alive" (radio edit) (2013) New West Records
- "Hit Me" (radio edit) (2014) New West Records
