= Jordi Mas Castells =

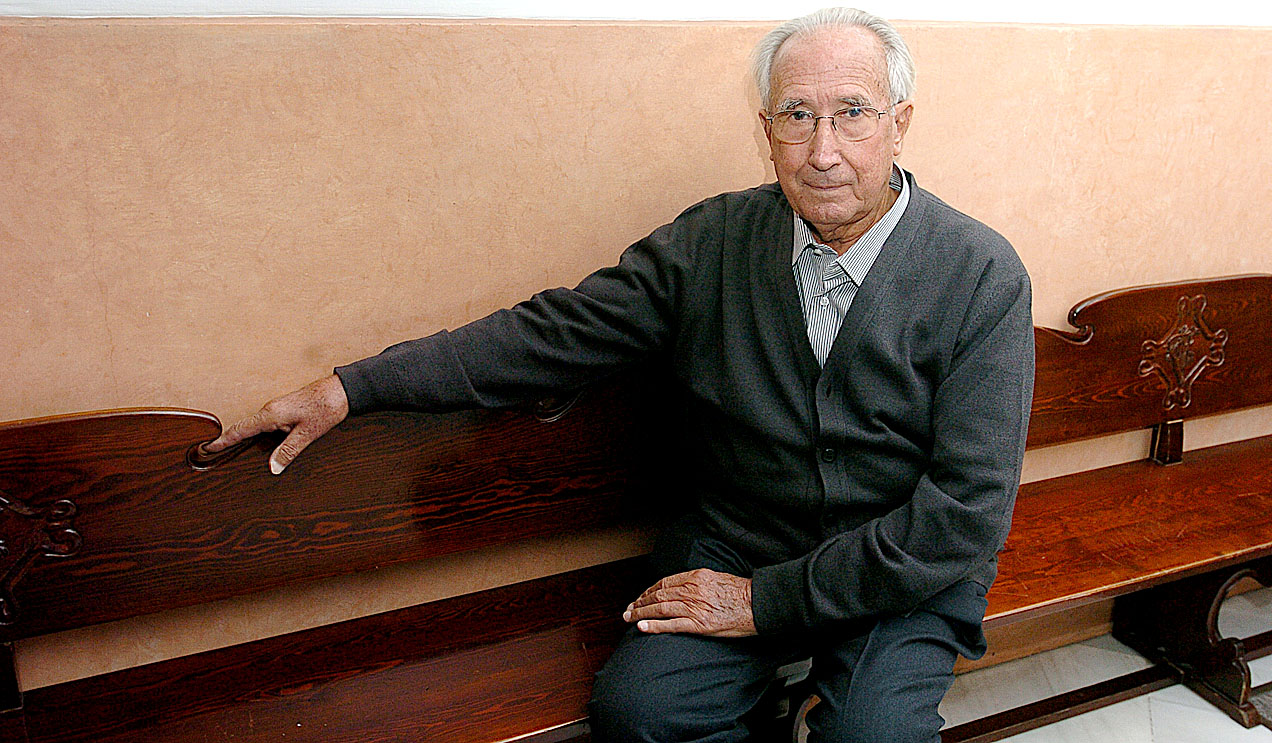
- Mas in October 2008
- Born: Jordi Mas Castells; 14 March 1930; La Garriga, Catalonia, Spain
- Died: 18 November 2010 (aged 80); La Garriga, Catalonia, Spain
- Occupations: Missionary priest in Cameroon, humanitarian
- Known for: Baba Georges
- Website: Jordi Mas (Camerun)

Jordi Mas Castells (14 March 1930 – 18 November 2010) was a Spanish priest who lived and worked from 1961 to his death in Cameroon, mainly in the Far North Region, close to lake Chad. In Cameroon, he made hundreds of wells, built hospitals, founded schools, and organized workshops to improve the knowledge of women from different communities. In 2008, the town council in La Garriga honoured him as Illustrious Citizen.

== Biography ==
=== Early life ===
Jordi Mas was born in La Garriga (Vallès Oriental) on 14 March 1930. At 24 he was ordained and his first destinations as vicar were Esplugues de Llobregat, la Geltrú (Vilanova i la Geltrú) and the Miraculosa parish in Barcelona. In 1961, he left as a missionary to a much harder scenery, which he himself chose: first some cities in the south of Cameroon and later in the Far North Region of the country in the wide Sahel strip. His last towns were Makary and Blangoua, close to lake Chad, in Muslim black Africa. From 1961 to 2010 he worked supporting his small congregations and helping them in educational, healthy and social areas.

=== Missionary career ===
When he arrived he realized those people did not need a missionary as they were mostly either animists or Muslims, but they needed his help in their most basic needs such as food, water, health, education...

"I have no solution. It's up to those in power to find it at a global level. Yet, it would be stupid just to think that, as you cannot solve it all, it is not worth doing anything. The world is single country to which we all belong as citizens. You find out that to face such basic needs you must get down to work for their development. First you must live, then you can philosophize".

Jordi Mas Castells, missionary

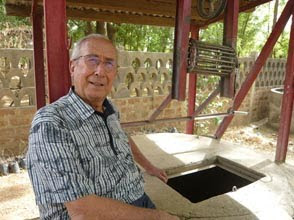
Jordi Mas, next to a well in Makary (Far North Region, Cameroon)

He specialized in building wells which stopped villagers, particularly girls, the weakest ones in that society, from having to walk long distances to get drinking water for their families and cattle. During his long stay in the country he built hundreds of them.

Mas was also aware that health was one of the weaknesses of the region. Therefore, together with the Swiss doctor Giuseppe Maggi (1910-1988) he founded the hospitals of Tokombéré (1962), Zina (1970) and Mada (1978). In the latter, a heath reference center, he drove patients in a jeep-ambulance for many years, which enabled him to get to know the territory and, mainly, to be close to the 250,000 inhabitants living in the surroundings of the hospital, a vast area of about 200 kilometres across four countries, Cameroon, Chad, Niger and Nigeria.

In 1988, when doctor Maggi died, Jordi Mas went on to founding schools, as it was evident for him that people without education have neither hope nor future. As a result of this work in 1998 he opened the big professional school of Blangoua CEFAVIHAR (Educational centre for the improvement of life in rural areas), next to lake Chad. In this school, which also includes a student residence promoted by Mans Unides, about forty youngsters from the villages near the lake can learn mechanics, electricity, welding, carpentry, business management, sewing, typing, computer studies... There is also a primary school with 500 pupils, which was created thanks to the collaboration of some Catalan organizations grouped together in the charity Makary-Blangoua.

Mas later focused on the FEMAK home (Femmes de Makary) (2008), a meeting point for women of all religions in the region of Makary to relate, learn and exchange experiences. They had sewing workshops, computers and vegetable gardens and classrooms where they received education about health, eating habits and cooking.

”The future of Africa is women’s hands. They have always been underestimated, but they have an enormous capacity and potential and they will make Africa develop”
Jordi Mas Castells, missionary

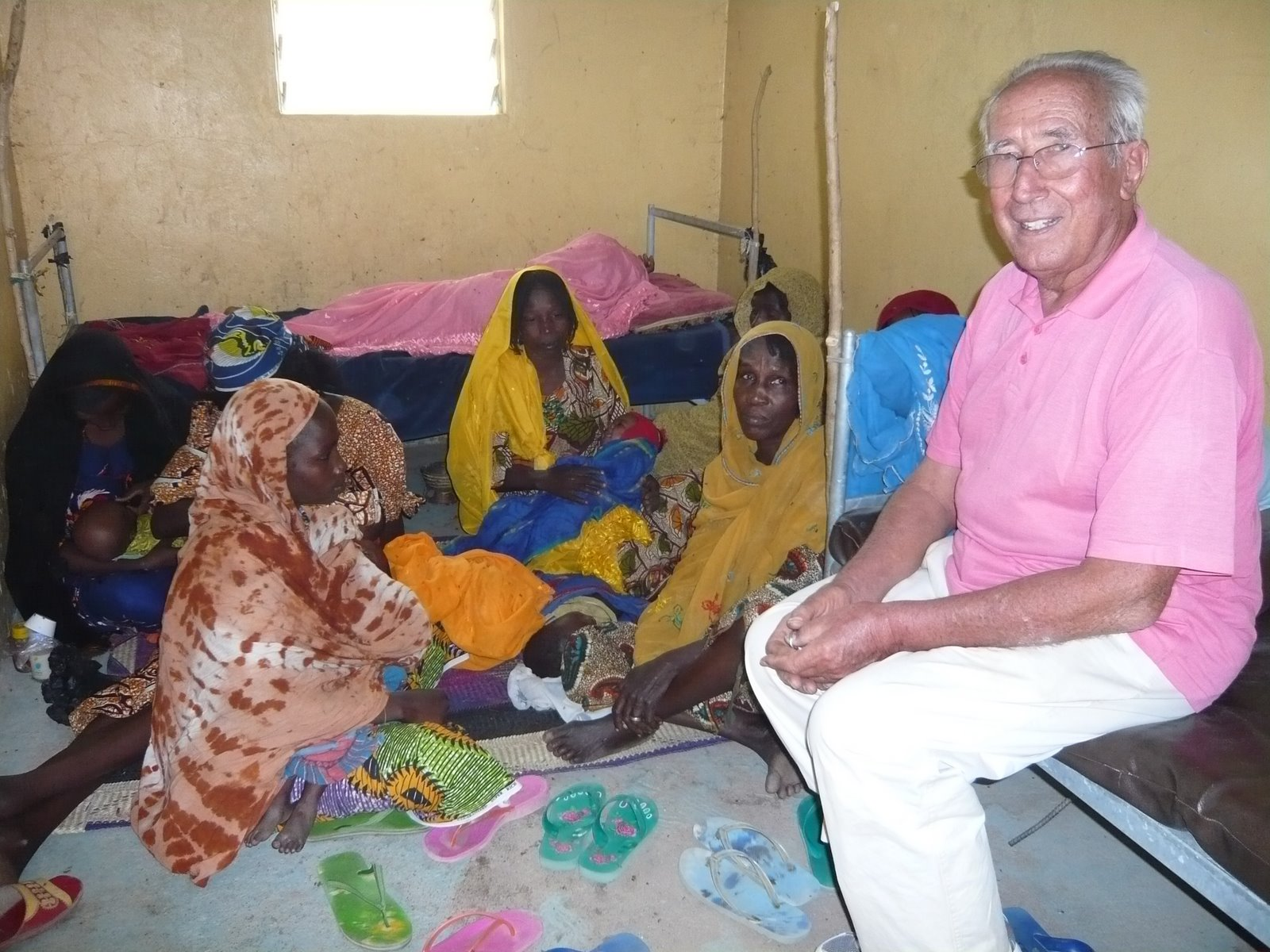
Jordi Mas, at the Mada Hospital (Far North Region, Cameroon)

=== Later life ===
In 2010, he fell ill and travelled to La Garriga to undergo the treatment which enabled him to go back to his home in Makary. However, he died on Thursday 18 November that year. He is buried in La Doma cemetery, in La Garriga.

Jordi Mas died, but his work is fully alive helping the people near the lake. Nowadays, November 2015, the Italian Fabio Musi, a long term Cameroon resident, is responsible for the general coordination of the different parishes and schools. He does it from Maroua, the Far North Region capital city of the country. In the last two parishes where the priest from La Garriga worked, namely Makary and Blangoua, there are two native priests in charge.

== Awards received ==
- Cross of the Order of Isabella the Catholic (2000) awarded by King Juan Carlos I of Spain a proposal by the Spanish ambassador in Cameroon. This award acknowledged “Jordi Mas’s great task for human promotion in the north of Cameroon”.
- (Catalonia) International Cooperation for Human Development Prize (2007) awarded by the Vallès Oriental County Council.
- (Catalonia) Illustrious Citizen of La Garriga (2008).
- (Catalonia) Josep Parera Prize (2008) given by the Social Work of Penedès savings bank. That prize acknowledged the outstanding career of people devoted to community development in social, humanitary and charity areas.

== Bibliography ==
- (in Catalan) Fàbregas, Xavier (1967). Catalans terres enllà (in Catalan). Bruguera.
- (in Catalan) Marqués, Ignasi (2001). Visitant missioners (in Catalan). Centre de Pastoral Litúrgica. ISBN 978-84-7467-718-8.
- (in Catalan) Medina, Jesús (2008). Baba Georges (documental) (in Catalan). CTL Comunicació.
- (in Catalan) Lapuerta, Montserrat, ed. (2009). Retrats de Garriguencs Il·lustres (in Catalan). El Garbell. ISBN 978-84-613-6776-4.
- (in Catalan) Pérez Sánchez, Miquel Àngel (2011). Cartes des del Camerun: sis anys a Blangoua (in Catalan). Edicions Saragossa. ISBN 978-84-938397-5-8.
