= Half Moon Light =

Studio album by The Lone Bellow
- Released: February 7, 2020
- Length: 47:45
- Label: Dualtone
- Producer: Aaron Dessner

The Lone Bellow chronology
Walk Into a Storm (2017)	Half Moon Light (2020)	Love Songs for Losers (2022)

Professional ratings
Aggregate scores
Source	Rating
Metacritic	72/100
Review scores
Source	Rating
AllMusic	3.5/5 stars
American Songwriter	4/5 stars
No Ripcord	4/10
Spectrum Culture	3.5/5 stars

Half Moon Light is the fourth studio album by American band The Lone Bellow. It was released on February 7, 2020 under Dualtone Records.

The first single from the album, "Count on Me" was released on October 23, 2019.

== Critical reception ==
Half Moon Light was met with generally favorable reviews from critics. At Metacritic, which assigns a weighted average rating out of 100 to reviews from mainstream publications, this release received an average score of 72, based on 6 reviews.

== Track listing ==
Half Moon Light track listing
No.	Title	Writer(s)	Length
1.	"Intro"		0:26
2.	"I Can Feel You Dancing"	Brian Elmquist; Jason Pipkin; Zach Williams	4:00
3.	"Good Times"	Aaron Dessner; Brian Elmquist; Jason Pipkin; Zach Williams	3:49
4.	"Wonder"	Brian Elmquist; Zach Williams	4:58
5.	"Count on Me"	Anderson East; Jake Mitchell; Aaron Raitiere; Zach Williams	2:40
6.	"Wash It Clean"	Aaron Dessner; Brian Elmquist; Zach Williams	4:09
7.	"Enemies"	Brian Elmquist; Zach Williams	3:33
8.	"Interlude"		0:39
9.	"Just Enough to Get By"	Brian Elmquist; Kanene Donehey Pipkin	3:05
10.	"Martingales"	Brian Elmquist; Jason Pipkin; Zach Williams	4:07
11.	"Illegal Immigrant"	Brian Elmquist; Bobby Hamrick; Kat Higgins	4:23
12.	"Friends"	Aaron Dessner; Brian Elmquist; Zach Williams	3:55
13.	"Dust Settles"	Brian Elmquist; Jason Pipkin	3:05
14.	"August"	Aaron Dessner; Brian Elmquist	3:51
15.	"Finale"		1:05

== Charts ==
Chart performance for Half Moon Light
Chart (2020)	Peak position
UK Americana Albums (OCC)	9
US Billboard 200	11
US Americana/Folk Albums (Billboard)	4
US Independent Albums (Billboard)	18
US Top Album Sales (Billboard)	11
US Top Rock Albums (Billboard)	26
