= Love Songs for Losers =

Studio album by the Lone Bellow
- Released: November 4, 2022
- Studio: Former residence of Roy Orbison (Nashville)
- Length: 42:15
- Label: Dualtone
- Producer: The Lone Bellow

The Lone Bellow chronology
Half Moon Light (2020)	Love Songs for Losers (2022)	Live (2023)

Love Songs for Losers is the fifth studio album by American folk rock trio the Lone Bellow. It was released on November 4, 2022, by Dualtone Records. The album was produced by the band themselves, a significant departure from their previous efforts which were produced by outside producers.

On June 9, 2023, a deluxe edition of the album was released with four new songs that did not make the original track listing, including a reworked version of "The Restless", a song the Lone Bellow first released in 2018 from their EP of the same title.

== Background ==
Love Songs for Losers was first conceived at a church in Nashville, Tennessee, and was recorded at the former residence of Roy Orbison over an eight-week time period. Of the album's title, band member Zachary Williams opined in a press release that "I've always seen myself as a loser in love [and have] never been able to get it completely right".

== Singles ==
The album's lead single, "Gold", was released on July 21, 2022. The song examines the real-life effects that have stemmed from the opioid crisis. The second single, "Honey", was released simultaneously with the album announcement on September 14, 2022. The third single, "Homesick", was released on September 28, 2022. The fourth single, "Unicorn", was released on October 19, 2022.

== Critical reception ==
Professional ratings
Aggregate scores
Source	Rating
Metacritic	80/100
Review scores
Source	Rating
AllMusic	4/5 stars
American Songwriter	4/5 stars
PopMatters	7/10

Upon release, Love Songs for Losers received positive acclaim from critics. At Metacritic, which assigns a normalized rating out of 100 based on reviews from mainstream publications, the album has a mean score of 80 based on four reviews, indicating "generally favorable reviews".

== Track listing ==
Love Songs for Losers track listing
No.	Title	Writer(s)	Length
1.	"Honey"	Brian Elmquist; Kanene Pipkin; Zach Williams	4:36
2.	"Gold"	Elmquist; Trent Dabbs; Williams	3:22
3.	"I'm in Love"	Elmquist; Pipkin; Williams	3:07
4.	"Cost of Living"	Pipkin; Philip Barnes	4:00
5.	"Dreaming"	Elmquist; Williams	3:50
6.	"Move"	Pipkin; Williams	3:35
7.	"Unicorn"	Elmquist; Dabbs; Williams	4:06
8.	"Wherever Your Heart Is"	Elmquist; Luke Preston; Williams	4:01
9.	"Homesick"	Williams	3:38
10.	"Caught Me Thinkin'"	Elmquist; Pipkin; Williams	3:15
11.	"The Great Divide"	Elmquist	4:45
Total length:			42:15

Love Songs for Losers — deluxe edition
No.	Title	Writer(s)	Length
12.	"Fallin'"	Elmquist; Williams	3:26
13.	"Same Tears"	Pipkin; Dabbs; Williams	3:07
14.	"Tongue Tied"	Elmquist	4:52
15.	"The Restless"	Elmquist; Justin Glasco; Williams	3:23
Total length:			57:03
