= What a Time to Be Alive (The Lone Bellow album) =

Studio album by the Lone Bellow
- Released: February 13, 2026
- Length: 46:45
- Label: Burly Bellow; Soundly
- Producer: Brian Elmquist

The Lone Bellow chronology
Live (2023)	What a Time to Be Alive (2026)

What a Time to Be Alive is the sixth studio album by the American folk rock trio the Lone Bellow. It was released on February 13, 2026, under the trio's imprint Burly Bellow Music with distribution handled by Soundly Music.

== Background ==
The Lone Bellow initially began work on What a Time to Be Alive at a recording studio owned by a friend of the trio in Henderson, Kentucky. However, while the band was on tour in Chicago, their touring van was burglarized and their equipment, which included a hard drive that contained the initial recordings for the album were stolen. A crowdfunding drive was initiated to replace their stolen equipment, in which afterwards the trio restarted work on the album in Nashville, Tennessee.

== Promotion ==
The album's lead single, "Common Folk", was released on August 24, 2025. Of the song, the Lone Bellow stated in a press release: "We've always been drawn to the kind of everyday heroes we don't celebrate enough - the ones who show up, help others, and never ask for credit, [such as] nurses, diner workers, folks doing the work no one notices. That quiet kind-of strength has always fascinated us, and we wanted to honor it in this song." The second single, "No Getting Over You", was released on October 8, 2025. mxdwn Music wrote that the song "balances quiet reflection with powerful moments of release, rising into layered instrumentation that feel both personal." The third single, "Night Goes Black", was released on October 30, 2025, with an accompanying music video premiering exclusively on Holler.

The album's fourth single, "You Were Leaving", was released on November 22, 2025 in tandem with the announcement of the album. The album's fifth single, a cover of Dolly Parton and Kenny Rogers' "Islands in the Stream", was released on December 6, 2025. The Lone Bellow has covered the song in concert over the years and decided to record a studio version as an incentive to fans.

== Track listing ==
What a Time to Be Alive track listing
No.	Title	Writer(s)	Length
1.	"After the Rain"	Brian Elmquist; Kanene Donehey Pipkin; Zach Williams; Julian Dorio; Tyler Geerstma	3:13
2.	"I Did It for Love"	Elmquist; Pipkin; Williams; Dorio; Geertsma	4:19
3.	"You Were Leaving"	Elmquist; Pipkin; Williams; Dorio; Geertsma	4:30
4.	"Common Folk"	Elmquist; Williams; Trent Dabbs	4:10
5.	"No Getting Over You"	Elmquist; Pipkin; Williams; Barbee Peter Davin; Dorio; Geertsma	3:57
6.	"Say"	Williams	4:43
7.	"Staring at the Sun"	Elmquist; Pipkin; Williams; Dorio; Williams	3:54
8.	"Night Goes Black"	Elmquist; Pipkin; Williams	3:06
9.	"Honeysuckle"	Elmquist; Pipkin; Williams	3:08
10.	"Islands in the Stream"	Barry Gibb; Maurice Gibb; Robin Gibb	4:04
11.	"I'm Here for You"	Elmquist; Pipkin; Williams; Dorio; Geertsma	3:42
12.	"What a Time to Be Alive"	Elmquist; Pipkin; Williams; Dorio; Geertsma	3:59
Total length:			46:45

== Personnel ==
Credits adapted from Tidal.

=== The Lone Bellow ===
- Brian Elmquist – production, background vocals (all tracks); bass guitar (track 1), acoustic guitar (2–12)
- Kanene Donehey Pipkin – vocal production, background vocals (all tracks); mandolin (4), bass guitar (6)
- Zach Williams – lead vocals (all tracks), acoustic guitar (4, 9)

=== Additional contributors ===
- Christian Paschall – additional production, engineering, mixing
- Dave McNair – additional production, engineering, mastering
- Jon Truman – engineering (all tracks), drums (10)
- Peter Barbee – engineering, vocal production (all tracks); piano (2)
- Tyler Geertsma – vocal production (all tracks), organ (1), bass guitar (2, 3, 5, 7–9, 11, 12), trumpet (6), artwork
- Julian Dorio – drums (1–9, 11, 12)
- Daniel McKenzie – acoustic guitar (3), piano (7), synthesizer (11)
- Nate Leath – violin (3), fiddle (12)
- David Crutcher – organ (6, 8)
- Bryan Dawley – bass guitar (10)
- Emily Dorio – photography
