= Mission Control (album) =

Studio album by The Whigs
- Released: January 22, 2008
- Recorded: Sunset Sound and the Sound Factory in Los Angeles, California
- Genre: Garage rock
- Label: ATO Records
- Producer: Rob Schnapf

The Whigs chronology
Give 'Em All a Big Fat Lip (2005)	'''Mission Control''' (2008)	In the Dark (2010)

Professional ratings
Aggregate scores
Source	Rating
Metacritic	(71/100) link
Review scores
Source	Rating
Allmusic	link
Entertainment Weekly	A-
Pitchfork Media	(7.0/10)
Rolling Stone	link
Spin	3.5/5 stars
Rock Romantics	link
Stuff	(9.0/10)

Mission Control is the second full-length album by Athens, Georgia-based garage rock band The Whigs. It was released on January 22, 2008, by ATO Records, on CD and vinyl simultaneously.

== Track listing ==
All songs written by Parker Gispert.

1. "Like a Vibration" – 2:36
2. "Production City" – 3:01
3. "I Never Want to Go Home" – 2:49
4. "Right Hand on My Heart" – 4:14
5. "Sleep Sunshine" – 4:26
6. "1000 Wives" – 3:10
7. "Hot Bed" – 3:05
8. "Already Young" – 3:18
9. "I Got Ideas" – 3:25
10. "Need You Need You" – 2:44
11. "Mission Control" – 4:33
