= Luis Gispert =

American artist

- Born: Jersey City, New Jersey, United States
- Education: Yale University, Art Institute of Chicago
- Known for: Sculpture
- Movement: Contemporary art

Luis Gispert (born Jersey City, New Jersey, United States, 1972) is an American sculptor and photographer, living and working in Brooklyn, New York. Gispert earned an MFA at Yale University in 2001, a BFA in Film from Art Institute of Chicago in 1996, and attended Miami Dade College from 1990 to 1992.

== Career ==
Luis Gispert creates art through a wide range of media, including photographs, film, sounds, and sculptures, focusing upon hip-hop, youth culture, and Cuban-American history. Some of his sculptures incorporate objects identified with hip hop, such as turntables, chrome tire rims, and boom boxes, into functional designs usable in other manners, such as furniture. He first rose to fame due to his well received Chearleaders set of art photographs which he started in 2000 - several of the pics feature chonga style women, and helped to establish chongas as a Miami icon, comparable to "ghetto fabulous" images. His installation art graced the 2002 Whitney Biennial at the Whitney Museum of American Art, and has been exhibited internationally at galleries and museums such the Brooklyn Museum of Art, and the Studio Museum in Harlem in New York, Art Pace in Texas, the Museum of Contemporary Art, North Miami, the Contemporary Arts Museum Houston, Palazzo Brocherasio in Turin, and the Royal Academy in London. Gispert has also participated in several exhibitions with high-profile commercial galleries including Gagosian Gallery, Andrea Rosen Gallery, and Deitch Projects in New York. He is represented by Mary Boone Gallery in New York, Rhona Hoffman Gallery in Chicago, and Moran Bondaroff in Los Angeles.

Gispert describes the first ten years of his career as a period during which he underwent a personal transformation in his attempt to comprehend why certain objects and events strike him physically and emotionally. Always, there is the push- and-pull between seduction and aggression in his work that inundates the viewer's senses. His photographs, videos, films and sculptures are complex, composed arrangements that delve into the familiar and the unknown, the mainstream and the marginalized, to expose and address the various subcultures that infiltrate the mainstream. These subjects also provided him the means to explore the sheer aggressiveness and excessiveness of the hip hop ornamentation or the effusively decorated interior of his immigrant family's homes. Similarly the volume of the rap lyrics lip-synched by a cheerleader in Can It Be That It Was All So Simple Then, 2001, or the unnerving scream of a car alarm mouthed by another cheerleader in Block Watching, 2002, is overwhelming. In 2011, the Feminist art collective Go! Push Pops performed Block Watching Remix at the Moore St. Market in a show curated by Michelle Lopez during Bushwick Open Studios remixing footage of Luis Gispert's original 2002 Block Watching video. In 2013, Luis Gispert invited Go! Push Pops to perform Block Watching Remix during the Brooklyn Museum's Annual Artist Ball.

His most recent photographs of landscapes viewed through the windows of customized vehicles achieve the widescreen grandeur of CinemaScope film and provide the viewer the sensation of occupying the driver's seat. He shot hundreds of sheets of film for each landscape in an attempt to capture the perfect vista, but ultimately collaged various details to produce landscapes that most closely adhered to his ideal.

Gispert's cheerleader series of lush, color photographs depicting cheerleaders accessorized with the hip hop gold chains and jewelry, first brought him to the art world's attention. Although this series was perceived as a reference to popular culture and cultural identity, Gispert approached the subject from the perspective of Baroque religious paintings depicting levitating saints at moments of epiphany and the conventions of sports photography, which established the iconic image of the sports hero in mid air. The cheerleader photographs were achieved with cinematic techniques and methods to produce special effects, most notably the green-screen. Gispert used a long exposure to photograph his models suspended on wires in a chroma-key green room. In movies, actors play against the green background, which is typically superimposed onto another backdrop to complete the illusion. However, Gispert retained the green field to reveal the artifice.

== Filmmaking ==
Filmmaking has played a major role in Gispert's career. He has consistently contrasted films that use the syntax of cinema as exercises in the manipulation of sound, image and film time, as in Stereomongrel, 2005, and Smother, 2008, with raw, aggressive videos that deliberately contradict film conventions. Gispert has used elements of destruction to designate the end of one phase of his career and the beginning of another. He always approaches new projects by trying to work himself out of a problem. This occasionally requires the obliteration of the past and has manifested itself in a sculpture composed of all the props and hip hop ornamentation that he used in his Cheerleader series or the fictitious baptism of a pet dog (representing himself as a child) by fire in order to liberate his creativity in his film “Smother”.

Other works include films such as Stereomongrel.

In 2024, Gispert released Cajita (Little Box), which won Best Film at the New York Latino Film Festival. Cajita's Miami premiere took place at the Pérez Art Museum Miami, Florida, where the artist is featured in the collection. Cajita narrates the story of an immigrant who flees their country inside of a crate.
