= Then Came the Morning =

Studio album by The Lone Bellow
- Released: January 27, 2015
- Genres: Alternative country; country rock; folk rock; indie folk; indie rock
- Label: Descendant
- Producer: Aaron Dessner

The Lone Bellow chronology
The Lone Bellow (2014)	Then Came the Morning (2015)	Walk Into a Storm (2017)

Professional ratings
Aggregate scores
Source	Rating
Metacritic	68/100
Review scores
Source	Rating
AllMusic	4/5 stars
Billboard	3.5/5 stars
The Boston Globe	2.5/5 stars
The Daily Telegraph	4/5 stars
Drowned in Sound	7/10
Paste	7.6/10
PopMatters	5/10

Then Came the Morning is the second full-length studio album by the American folk rock trio the Lone Bellow. The album was released on January 27, 2015 by Descendant Records, and the producer was Aaron Dessner of the National.

== Track listing ==
All tracks are written by Zach Williams, Kanene Donehy Pipkin and Brian Elmquist.

No.	Title	Writer(s)	Length
1.	"Then Came the Morning"		4:11
2.	"Fake Roses"		3:33
3.	"Marietta"		3:35
4.	"Take My Love"		3:14
5.	"Call to War"		3:28
6.	"Watch Over Us"		3:33
7.	"Diners"		4:23
8.	"Heaven Don't Call Me Home"	Brian Elmquist	2:35
9.	"If You Don't Love Me"		3:14
10.	"Telluride"		4:17
11.	"To the Woods"		1:59
12.	"Cold As It Is"		2:55
13.	"I Let You Go"		3:25
Total length:			44:22

== Personnel ==
- Zach Williams Composer, Guitar (Acoustic), Handclapping, Stomping, Vocals
- Kanene Donehey Pipkin Composer, Handclapping, Mandolin, Stomping, Vocals
- Brian Elmquist Composer, Guitar (Acoustic), Guitar (Electric), Handclapping, Stomping, Vocals
- Jason Pipkin Bass, Bass (Electric), Guitar (Electric), Handclapping, Piano, Stomping
- Michael Atkinson French Horn
- Thomas Bartlett Fender Rhodes, Keyboards, Organ, Piano, Unknown Instrument
- Greg Calbi Mastering
- Caleb Clardy Composer
- Logan Coale Bass (Upright), Double Bass
- Aaron Dessner Arranger, Bass, Composer, Drums, Engineer, Fender Rhodes, Guitar (12 String), Guitar (Acoustic), Guitar (Electric), Handclapping, Hi String Guitar, Keyboards, Orchestration, Percussion, Producer, Stomping, Unknown Instrument
- Bryce Dessner Orchestration
- Brian Griffin Drums, Handclapping, Stomping
- Jay Harren A&R
- Terry Hemmings Executive Producer
- Clarice Jensen Cello
- Peter Katis Mixing
- Matt Knapp Lap Steel Guitar, Pedal Steel
- Benjamin Lanz Orchestration, Trombone
- Nick Lloyd Organ (Hammond), Piano
- The Lone Bellow Arranger, Primary Artist
- Jonathan Low Engineer
- Rob Moose Orchestration, Viola, Violin
- Brian Murphy Composer
- Tim Parker Design, Layout
- Chris Pereira Design, Handclapping, Layout, Photography, Stomping
- Jeff Rogers Design, Layout
- Mackenzie Rollins Photography
- Steven Sebring Photography
- Caroline Shaw Orchestration, Violin
- Alexandra Sopp Flute
- Spencer Handclapping, Stomping
