= Walk Into a Storm =

Studio album by The Lone Bellow
- Released: September 17, 2017
- Recorded: November 2016
- Studio: RCA Studio A, Nashville, Tennessee, United States
- Genre: Americana
- Length: 38:33
- Language: English
- Label: Descendant/Sony Masterworks
- Producer: Dave Cobb

The Lone Bellow chronology
Then Came the Morning (2015)	Walk Into a Storm (2017)	Half Moon Light (2020)

Walk Into a Storm is a 2017 studio album by American indie folk band The Lone Bellow. The album has received positive reviews from critics.

== Reception ==
Editors at AllMusic rated this album 3 out of 5 stars, with critic Timothy Monger writing that "the band's formula remains intact as they deliver the gutsy three-part harmonies and foot-stomping folk-soul that have become their trademark" and speculates that this album is a misstep because the band "may [have] settled a little too comfortably into their initial level of success and settled for keeping the machine running". Hal Horowitz of American Songwriter scored this release 3.5 out of 5 stars, writing that the band is more focused on this release and producer Dave Cobb "plays to the band’s strengths". Stephen Thompson of NPR's First Listen wrote that this release "capture[s] the group's earnest, agreeable charm, dispensed via songs that amble and soar" and that it comes "stacked with charisma-drenched ringers". In Paste, Lee Zimmerman scored Walk Into a Storm a 7.6 out of 10, praising the depth of the lyrics and summing up that this release can continue the band's success.

== Track listing ==
1. "Deeper in the Water" (Brian Elmquist, Jeremy Lutito, Kanene Donehey Pipkin, and Zachary Williams) – 3:52
2. "Is It Ever Gonna Be Easy" (Elmquist, Jason Pipkin, K. Pipkin, and Williams) – 3:12
3. "May You Be Well" (Elmquist, J. Pipkin, K. Pipkin, and Williams) – 4:54
4. "Come Break My Heart Again" (K. Pipkin and Williams) – 3:39
5. "Feather" (Elmquist, Justin Glasco, and K. Pipkin) – 3:43
6. "Walk Into a Storm" (Elmquist, K. Pipkin, and Williams) – 5:06
7. "Time's Always Leaving" (Elmquist, Glasco, and Williams) – 3:17
8. "Can't Be Happy for Long" (Elmquist, Glasco, and Williams) – 2:54
9. "Between the Lines" (Williams) – 4:27
10. "Long Way to Go" (Wyatt Earp and Williams) – 3:32

== Personnel ==
The Lone Bellow

- Brian Elmquist – acoustic guitar, electric guitar, piano, vocals
- Kanene Donehey Pipkin – vocals
- Zachary Williams – vocals

Additional personnel

- Brian Allen – bass
- Eric Ryan Anderson – inside photography
- David Angell – violin
- Ryan Booth – cover photo
- Dave Cobb]] – acoustic guitar, mixing, production
- David Davidson – violin
- Go De Jong – graphic design
- Justin Glasco – drums, Hammond organ, percussion, vocal production
- Gena Johnson – production assistance
- Stephen Lamb – copyist
- Pete Lyman – mastering
- Carole Neuen-Rabinowitz – cello
- Jason Pipkin – Hammond B3, lap steel guitar, mandolin, Mellotron, organ, piano, Wurlitzer
- Matt Ross-Spang – engineering
- Kristin Wilkinson – string arrangement, viola

== Chart performance ==
Walk Into a Storm reached 173 on the Billboard 200, fourth on Americana/Folk Albums, and 73 on the Rock Albums chart.

== See also ==
- List of 2017 albums
