= Ester Partegàs =

Spanish contemporary artist (born 1972)

- Born: 1972 (age 52–53); La Garriga, Catalonia, Spain
- Other names: Ester Partegas
- Education: Universitat de Barcelona, Hochschule der Künste
- Occupation(s): artist, educator

Ester Partegàs (born 1972) is a Spanish contemporary artist and educator. She lives and works in Brooklyn, New York.

== Biography ==
Ester Partegàs was born in 1972 in La Garriga, Barcelona, Spain. She has a B.F.A. degree (in sculpture) from the Universitat de Barcelona and has completed postgraduate studies at Hochschule der Künste in Berlin. In 1999 she was awarded the Botin Foundation Grant from Spain that sponsored her nine-month residency at the International Studio and Curatorial Program, New York (ISCP). She has also received the Joan Mitchell Foundation Grant and the Virginia Museum of Fine Arts Fellowship, among others.

Her work has been exhibited internationally, including the Aldrich Contemporary Art Museum (Connecticut), Museo Nacional Centro de Arte Reina Sofía (Madrid), 2nd Moscow Bienniale, Weatherspoon Art Museum (Greensboro, North Carolina), Walker's Point Center for the Arts (Milwaukee, Wisconsin), Virginia Commonwealth University (Richmond, Virginia), Cercle Cultural Caja Madrid (Barcelona), SculptureCenter (New York), Rice University Art Gallery (Houston, Texas), Queens Museum of Art (New York) and Whitney Museum of American Art (Altria, New York).

== Collections ==
- Museum of Modern Art (MoMA), New York City, New York
- The Dikeou Collection, Denver, Colorado
- Coca-Cola Espana Foundation, Madrid
- Instituto de la Juventud, Madrid
- CajaMadrid, Madrid
