= In the Dark (The Whigs album) =

Studio album by The Whigs
- Released: March 16, 2010
- Recorded: 2009
- Genre: Garage rock revival, indie rock
- Length: 41:31
- Label: ATO
- Producer: Ben Allen; Jay Joyce; Angelo Petraglia

The Whigs chronology
Mission Control (2008)	In the Dark (2010)	Enjoy the Company (2012)

Professional ratings
Aggregate scores
Source	Rating
Metacritic	59/100
Review scores
Source	Rating
Allmusic	3.5/5 stars
Slant Magazine	2.5/5 stars
Rolling Stone	3.5/5 stars

In the Dark is the third album from The Whigs. The album was released on March 16, 2010. Recording took place in band's hometown of Athens, Georgia. The band worked extensively with producer Ben Allen, notable for his production work on Animal Collective's Merriweather Post Pavilion, one of the most critically acclaimed albums of 2009. The album marks the band's first record with new permanent bassist Tim Deaux, replacing bassist Hank Sullivant, who departed the group in 2006 and joined MGMT.

On October 15, 2009, the Whigs released the title track, "In The Dark" as a free download. Two weeks later, the band released "Hundred / Million" for free download on their website.

== Track listing ==
All lyrics written by Parker Gispert; all music composed by The Whigs.

1. "Hundred / Million"
2. "Black Lotus"
3. "Kill Me Carolyne"
4. "Someone's Daughter"
5. "So Lonely"
6. "Dying"
7. "I Don't Even Care About The One I Love"
8. "Automatic"
9. "I Am For Real"
10. "In The Dark"
11. "Naked"
