= Prince Harvey =

American rapper, producer, singer and songwriter

- Born: Los Angeles, California
- Occupations: Rapper, producer, singer, songwriter
- Years active: 2012–present
- Website: princeharvey.com

Prince Harvey is an American rapper, producer, singer and songwriter. He is best known for his album PHATASS which he recorded at an Apple Store in New York City.

== Early life ==
Prince Harvey was born in Los Angeles, California. He grew up in the Caribbean, on the island of Dominica. He wrote his first song at the age of eight, inspired by the rapper, Juvenile's song "Back That Azz Up". At age 14, he moved to the Bronx, New York City with his family.

== Career ==
On July 7, 2012, Prince Harvey released "No Music" on SoundCloud. The song is completely a cappella, and re-appropriates a popular New York City clap-and-chant routine. In a recent documentary, Harvey stated that he wanted to showcase the voice as "the most important instrument", and decided to make an entire a cappella album. While recording the album, Harvey ran into an obstacle when a friend offered to transfer an apartment in his name. Within three days of moving in, he received a notice from the landlord that the rent on the apartment was outstanding. The locks were changed, and all his belongings were seized, including his computer with all of his recordings. Unable to afford a new computer, he visited the Apple Store for four months and used their display computers to create his album.

In November 2014, Harvey released "Sometimes" as the first single from PHATASS. In January 2015, he released an accompanying video, shot in the New York City Subway, where he jumps in and out of subway tracks, sails a paper boat, and drops cue cards while walking through the train cars similar to Bob Dylan's Subterranean Homesick Blues video.

On May 27, 2015, he released "The New Black" as the second single from PHATASS (acronym for Prince Harvey At The Apple Store: Soho), and announced that the album would be coming out that July.

On July 5, 2015, The Daily Beast published an article titled "He Made a Secret Album in an Apple Store" written by Matthew Narvin. The piece chronicles Harvey's experiences making PHATASS and announces the release date set for later that month. Within hours of publication the article had gone viral, being shared on social media by celebrities like Talib Kweli, Russell Simmons, Lil Wayne and news outlets and magazines like The Guardian and Billboard. Once word had gotten out about PHATASS, numerous publications proclaimed Prince Harvey a genius.

Harvey used this new attention to tour the United States and Europe. In October 2016, he released "Sorry" and announced that he had been working on a new EP titled Golden Child. On November 8, 2016, the day of the US Presidential Election, Harvey released "Stay Gold" as the first single from Golden Child. He also spoke about the election, indicating that he was not particularly excited about either candidate. "One wants me in jail, the other wants to kick me out of the country", he told Paper magazine. In Spring 2017, he released the EP Golden Child, a collaborative project with producer Holly.

On July 17, 2017, Harvey released "R.I.P. 2016" on SoundCloud, a song that told the story of the death of his step-father and his friend, Dorian, who died of a drug overdose while sleeping in the same bed with Harvey. That same day, he announced that he would be releasing a song a day for the next 100 days as a protest against Trump.

== Discography ==
=== Studio albums ===
- PHATASS (2015)

=== Mixtapes ===
- 400+ (2023)

=== Extended plays ===
- Golden Child (with Holly) (2016)
- SSICC (2019)
- SSICC II: Self Care As Warfare (2021)
- Physical Nomad (2024)

=== Singles ===
Song	Year	Album
"Sometimes"	2015	PHATASS
"The New Black"	2015	PHATASS
"Sorry"	2016	Non-album single
"Stay Gold"	2016	Golden Child
"R.I.P." 2016		Non-album single
"101"	2017	Non-album single
"2020 And Mariah	2020	SSICC II
"SCAW"	2021	SSICC II
"Aqueerius"	2022	400+
"Hold My Hand"	2022	400+
"Van Gogh"	2022	400+
"Why Would I"	2022	400+
"IJWD"	2023	Red Dress
"Cake"	2024	Red Dress
"1994"	2024	Physical Nomad
"Two Ships"	2024	Physical Nomad
"Skibidi Bibidi Boo"	2024	Physical Nomad
"Ben Crump"	2024	Physical Nomad

=== Music videos ===
Song	Year	Director	Description
"Sometimes"	2015	Prince Harvey	Shot entirely in the New York subway Prince is navigating the gritty subway while holding signs that contain song lyrics, sailing a paper boat.
"We Real Cool (Gwendolyn Brooks Cover)"	2015	Prince Harvey	
"The New Black"	2016	Prince Harvey, Julie Malice	Prince and friends, are filmed alternately in black and white and against bright colors, posing and dancing. Prince raps with a cloud of tulle around his neck, arms in white fishnets, at one point shown breaking out of handcuffs.
"SCAW (Self Care As Warfare"	2021	Prince Harvey	Prince and sometimes with friends is shot mainly in isolation referencing the global pandemic COVID-19
"Aqueerius"	2022	Herman Jean-Noël, Prince Harvey	Prince is sleeping on a mattress on the beach and is awoken by an incoming wave. He dances around while singing on the and at a construction site.
"Hold My Hand"	2023	Herman Jean-Noël, Prince Harvey	Prince zooms through New York City on a moped, courting multiple people.
"E.T."	2026	Herman Jean-Noël, Prince Harvey	Shot entirely in black and white (save for one small clip) Prince is scene in multiple scenes including behind bars, in a vintage London phone booth and wearing a plague doctor mask. Kyle Kidd is also featured in the video.
