= Victor J. Matthews =

Irish-Canadian classical scholar

- Born: Victor John Matthews; 29 January 1941; Derry, Northern Ireland, UK
- Died: 28 November 2004 (aged 63)
- Known for: publication of text and commentary on Panyassis of Halikarnassos

Academic background
- Education: Queen's University Belfast, McMaster University

Academic work
- Discipline: Classical studies
- Institutions: University of Guelph

Victor John Matthews (29 January 1941 – 28 November 2004) was an Irish-Canadian classical scholar. He is known for his publication of text and commentaries on Panyassis of Halikarnassos (1974) and Antimachus of Colophon (1996). He also wrote several articles on Hellenistic Poetry and Ancient Sport.

Matthews was born in Derry, Northern Ireland and studied at Foyle College, Queen's University Belfast, and McMaster University. He taught at the University of Guelph from 1965 until his death.
