= Michelle Lopez =

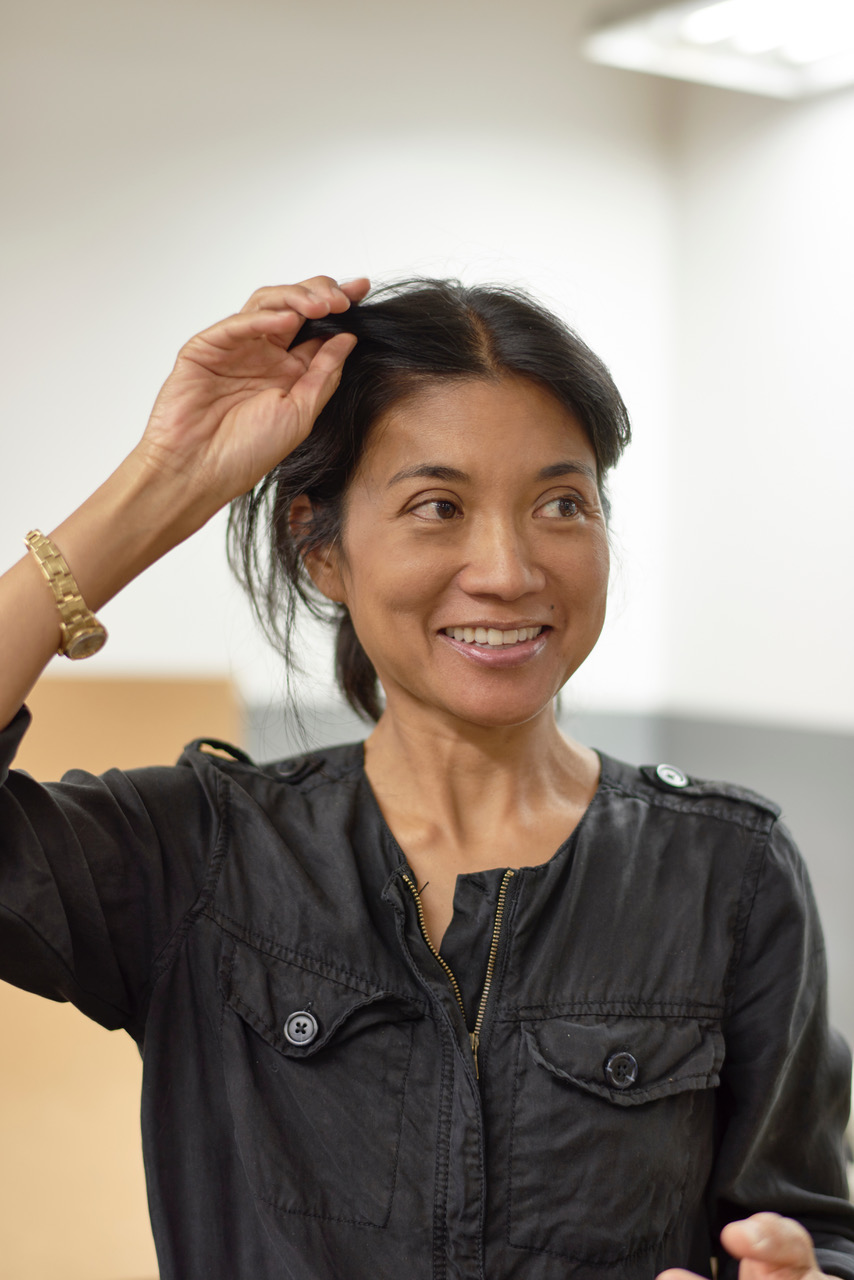
Artist Michelle Lopez

Michelle Lopez (born 1970 in Bridgeport, CT, of Filipino descent) is an American sculptor and installation artist, whose work incorporates divergent industrial materials to critique present day cultural phenomena. She lives and works in Philadelphia, PA.

== Biography ==
Michelle Lopez was raised by Filipino immigrant parents in Alexandria, Virginia. She received her B.A. in literature and art history in 1992 at Barnard College, and received her M.F.A in 1994 at The School of Visual Arts. Lopez is an Associate Professor of Sculpture in the Fine Arts Program at University of Pennsylvania School of Design and leads the Sculpture Division.

== Work ==
=== Boy (1999) ===
Lopez first gained critical attention with her sculpture Boy; a leather covered Honda that made its debut in 2000 as part of MoMA / PS1's Greater New York exhibition. Her work examines cultural phenomena related to fanaticism, violence, and questions of identity. Lopez' artistic process looks at post 9/11 experience and its abject residue on the sculptural object. Such forlorn themes can be found in "Blue Angels", "The Year We Made Contact", "Strange Fruit", "Banner Year".

In a Frieze review, Morgan Falconer describes Lopez's sculpture as "marvelously poised between being one strange thing and something stranger still."

=== Blue Angels (2011) ===
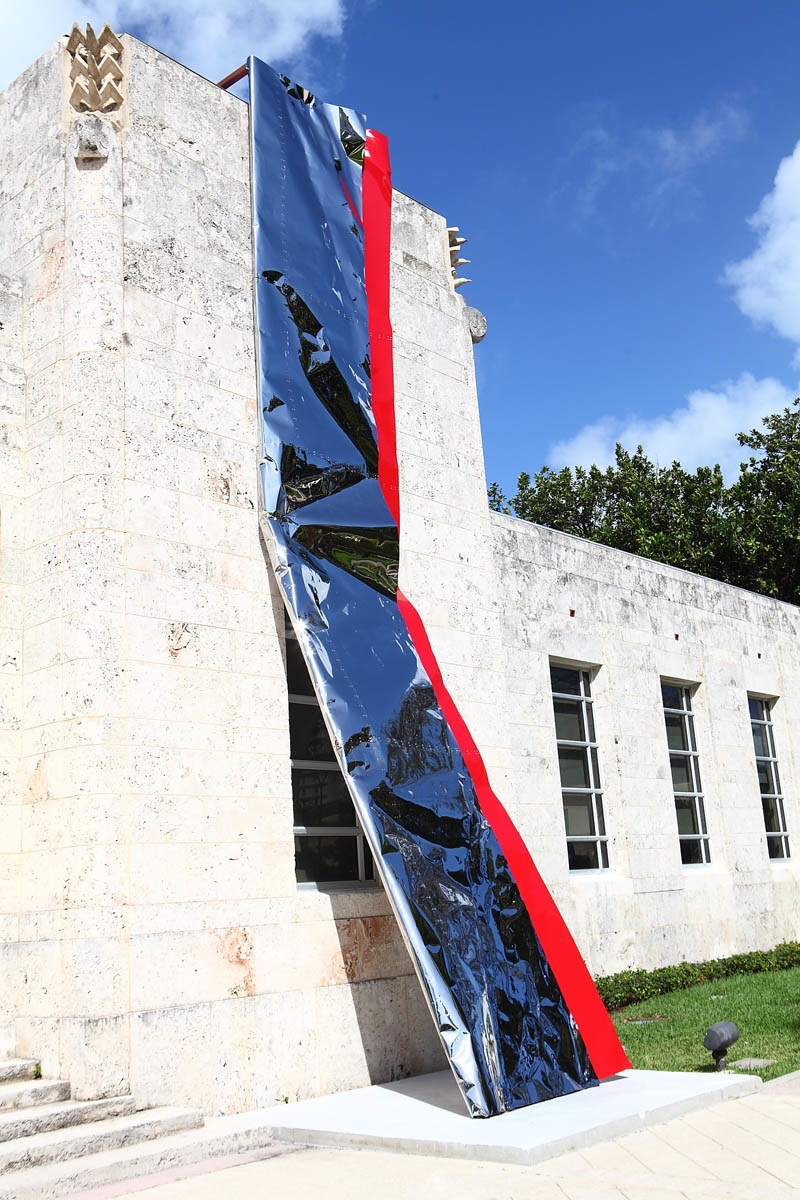
40 ft. Blue Angel Public Installation, Art Public, Bass Museum, Miami, 2013

Michael Wilson of Artforum reviewed Blue Angels: "Three roughly folded and heavily crumpled sheets of aluminum lean against the wall and tower above head height, their interiors painted blue or black, their exteriors white or colorlessly reflective. The suggestion that attempts at formal perfection are necessarily doomed to failure is clear, but in their fun-house-mirror distortions, these works direct that argument at not only artistic folly but also the viewer’s own vanities and imperfections. Still, the news isn’t all bad; there’s an insinuation in the aluminum’s shiny. paper- like surfaces of gift wrap, a hint of celebration and renewal.... [T]here is a hint of nose-thumbing at the consistent anality of the Guys, but Lopez's remake is more understated, more extensive, more radical-and a lot more appealing-than that might imply."

=== Smoke Clouds (2014) ===
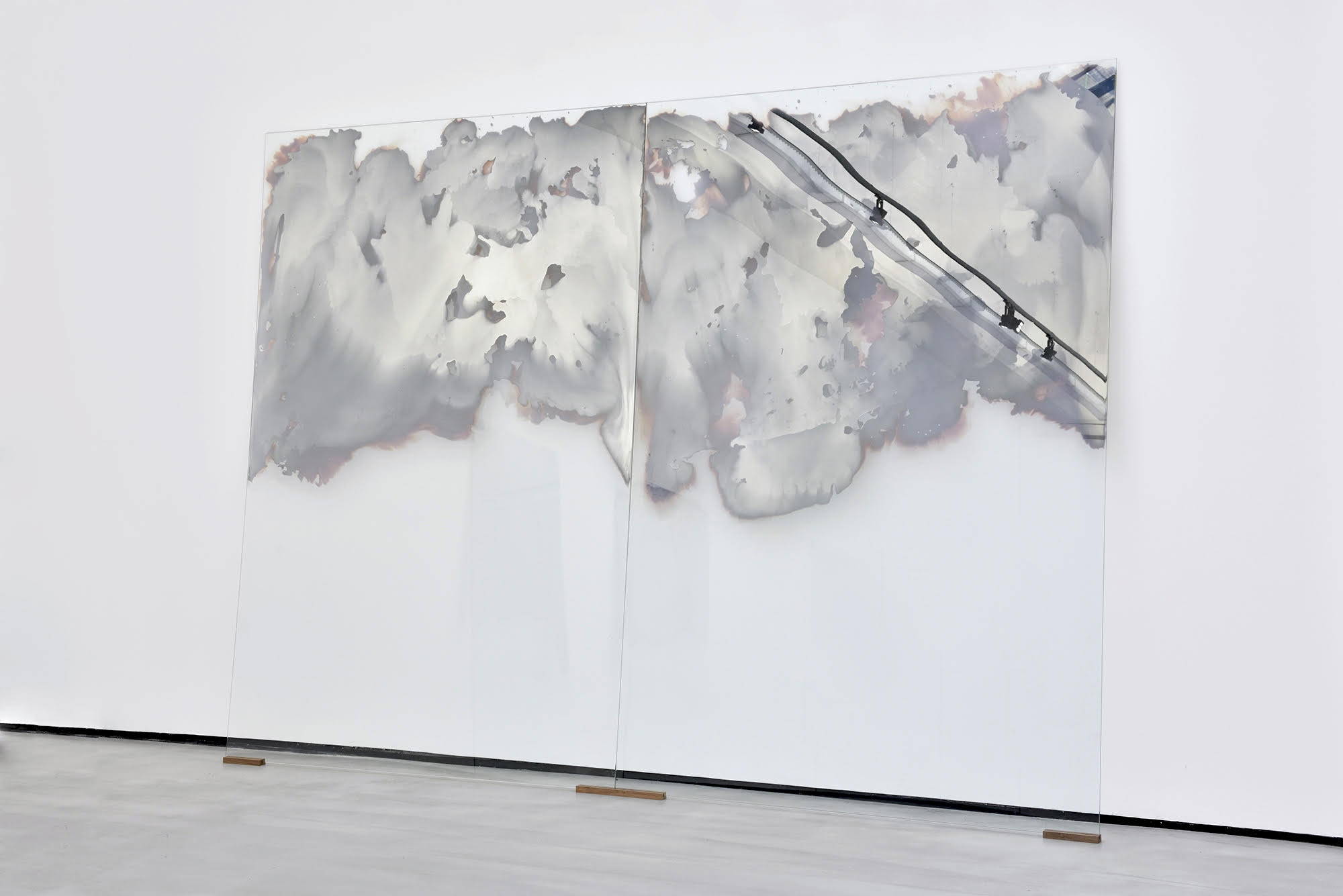
Smoke Clouds, silver nitrate on glass, 2016

In her Smoke Clouds work, Lopez explores themes of disappearance through the shifting image within the material of silver nitrate (mirroring solution) poured onto large-scale architectural glass. Lopez' mirrored smoke clouds reflect the room and the viewer through the original photographic process of silver tintype prints. The cloud image appears and disappears as a "puff of smoke" depending on the environment and the viewers position in the room. Lopez questions the status of the object and the artistic desire to make iconography, while also questioning the viewer's desire to claim it. Her sound and kinetic installation, Halyard, is a further iteration of examining invisible structures of power.

=== House of Cards and Ballast & Barricades (2018-2020) ===
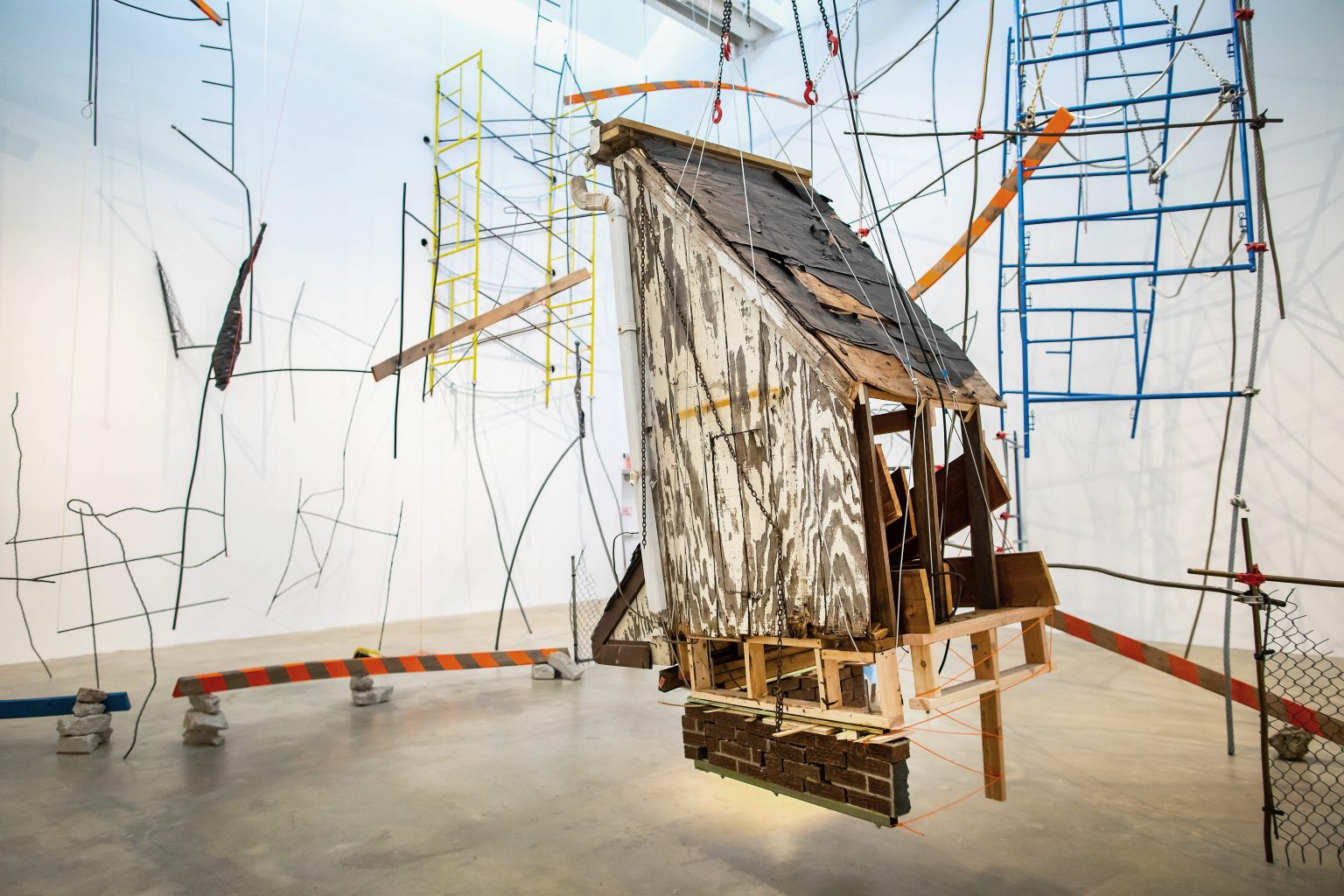
Ballast & Barricades, ICA, Philadelphia, 2020

House of Cards, an installation of an abject collapsing scaffolding system, employs steel rope and street rubble to lift spare minimal lines, as if forms of resistance could actually overcome the well-grooved forms of oppression. Reflecting the current social and political climate, a recent work shown in Ballast & Barricades suspends a thousand-pound building fragment by using remnants of cultural signifiers such as scaffolding for falling and climbing ladders as counter weight, creating a state on the verge of collapse.

=== Rope Prop Reversal (2023) ===
Writing on Lopez's 2023 solo exhibition 'Lasso Reprieve' with Commonwealth and Council LA, critic Vanessa Holyoak writes for Artforum: "Five pieces from the series “ROPE PROP REVERSAL,” 2023, build on Lopez’s long-term engagement with feminist subversions of Minimalism and abstraction, deconstructing the movements’ pretensions of monumentality and universality by restoring an unwieldy humility to the industrial materials that she manipulates. The artist’s series responds to Richard Serra’s canonical Minimalist work, One Ton Prop (House of Cards), 1969, reducing Serra’s cubic sheets of antimonial lead to a sinewy silhouette of their form, and in turn translating the sculpture’s heavy-metal grandiosity into a seemingly weightless geometrical skeleton [...] reframing Serra’s balancing act as one necessarily mediated by the supportive collaboration of material bodies."

=== Pandemonium (2025) ===
Pandemonium is a multimedia installation that explores the chaotic and volatile nature of our technological information cloud. Originally commissioned for The Galleries at Moore College of Art & Design, and developed over a period of 10 years, the work has since been selected for the Whitney Biennial 2026.

The immersive installation was originally designed for a planetarium setting (The Fels Planetarium at the Franklin Institute) with a large panoramic screen overhead. From this perspective, viewers look upward into a 360-degree environment that mimics the eye of a storm. It utilizes a combination of Mechatronics (unique only to the Planetarium performance) and Animation: Creating a tornado-like movement of digital and physical elements. Sound and VR Film immerse the viewer in a swirling information maelstrom of newspapers, magazines, and clippings flying overhead.

The Information Maelstrom offers a psychological representation of our political environment in the age of social media. The installation includes print headlines from the past 60 years that were swirling through the mechanism of a tornado machine that Lopez built to simulate the wind in a tornado. The images highlight how historical global politics remain strikingly relevant today. Woven together with this sculptural live action footage is the animation of a collapsing brick dome ripped apart by a tornado. Pandemonium serves as a response to the precarious nature of our environment and the feeling that social and technological infrastructures are in a state of collapse.

== Exhibitions ==
=== Solo and group exhibitions ===
Lopez has had solo exhibitions at Feature Inc.; Deitch Projects; Fondazione Trussardi; LA >< Art; Simon Preston Gallery; the Aldrich Contemporary Art Museum; Galerie Cristophe Gaillard, Paris; Institute of Contemporary Art Philadelphia; and Commonwealth and Council, Los Angeles, among others.

Lopez has shown in group exhibitions at the Brooklyn Museum, MoMA/PS 1, Yerba Buena Center for the Arts, Harvard Carpenter Center for the Arts, Museum of Contemporary Art & Design (Manilla, Philippines), and Artist Space. Recent group exhibitions include 'Process LAB,' The Fabric Workshop and Museum, Philadelphia, PA (2023); 'Scratching at the Moon,' Institute of Contemporary Art, Los Angeles (2024); and 'STEADY: Michelle Lopez & Ester Partegàs,' Ballroom Marfa, Marfa, TX (2024), CCA Wattis Institute (2025), The Whitney Biennial (2026). Her large-scale multimedia project Pandemonium was showcased in 2025 as a collaborative exhibition between The Galleries at Moore College of Art & Design and the Fels Planetarium at the Franklin Institute.

=== Public art ===
Public Sculptures include projects with the Public Art Fund and Miami Basel Art Public (Bass Museum, Miami, 2013); 'Chandelier,' Podium, Manila, Philippines (2021); and 'The Forum,' with Sharon Hayes at One Percent for Art, Penn's Landing Park, Philadelphia, PA (2027).

== Awards ==
In 2007, Lopez participated in a curatorial project with Grimm/Rosenfeld and wrote an essay on sculpture titled Exit Music (for a Film). She was awarded the NYFA Fiscal Sponsorship Grant in 2009 and was a recipient of the New York Foundation for the Arts Sculpture Fellowship in 2010. In 2019, she earned a Guggenheim fellowship in the category of Fine Arts. In 2023, she earned a Pew Center for Arts & Heritage Exhibition Fellowship for her project 'Pandemonium,' (2025) at the Franklin Institute and The Galleries at Moore College of Art. She also received a Pew Artist Fellowship (2025), and Knight Art& Tech Expansion Fellowship Technology grant (2025).

== Teaching ==
Formerly a faculty member at Yale School of Art in the Department of Sculpture, Columbia, NYU, the School of Visual Arts, and Bard in their graduate and undergraduate programs. She has also taught at UC Berkeley, where she headed the sculpture division and conducted sculptural research on large-scale 3D rapid-prototyping. Lopez now heads the Sculpture Division at the Stuart Weitzman School of Design, University of Pennsylvania.
