= Modern Creation =

Studio album by The Whigs
- Released: April 22, 2014
- Recorded: Fall 2013
- Genre: Garage rock revival, indie rock
- Length: 38:51
- Label: New West Records
- Producer: Jim Scott

The Whigs chronology
Enjoy the Company (2013)	Modern Creation (2014)

Singles from Modern Creation
- 1. "Hit Me" Released: 16 April 2014

Modern Creation is the fifth album by American garage rock band The Whigs, released on April 22, 2014 by New West. It was recorded within two weeks in Valencia, California. The producer of the album was Jim Scott, who has worked with such artists as Tom Petty, Dixie Chicks, and Red Hot Chili Peppers.

On April 16, 2014, the lead single, Hit Me, was released on YouTube.

== Track listing ==
Track list
No.	Title	Length
1.	"You Should Be Able To Feel It"	4:25
2.	"Asking Strangers For Directions"	3:04
3.	"The Particular"	3:26
4.	"Hit Me"	4:20
5.	"Modern Creation"	4:14
6.	"Friday Night"	3:16
7.	"She Is Everywhere"	3:03
8.	"Too Much In The Morning"	3:13
9.	"I Couldn't Lie"	5:07
10.	"The Difference Between One and Two"	4:45
Total length:		38:51

== Reception ==
Professional ratings
Aggregate scores
Source	Rating
Metacritic	75
Review scores
Source	Rating
Allmusic	3.5/5 stars
American Songwriter	3/5 stars
PopMatters	7/10 stars

Modern Creation received positive reviews from critics. It has a score of 75 out of 100 on Metacritic, based on reviews from 5 critics, indicating "generally favorable reviews".
