= Victor Matthews (artist) =

American painter (born 1963)

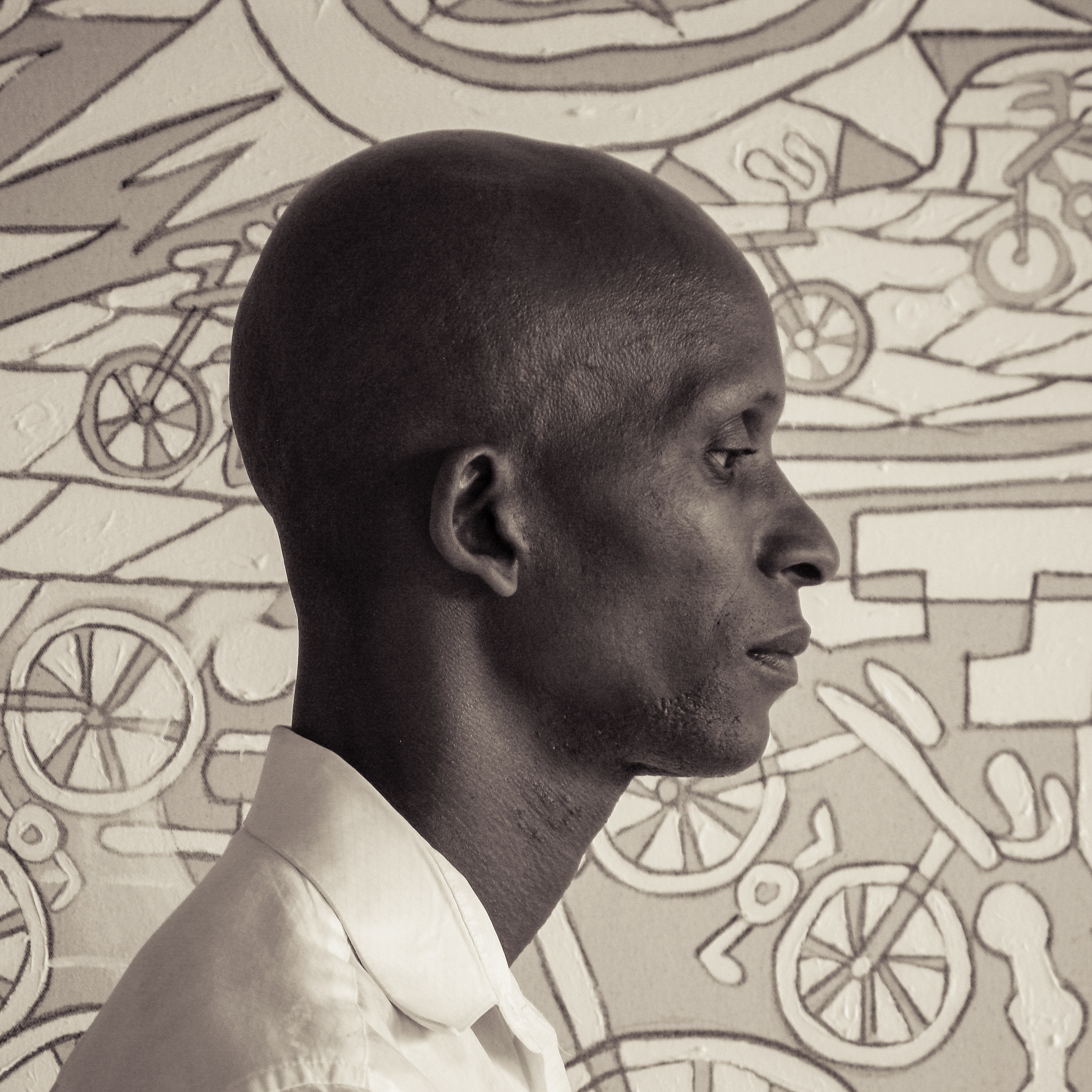
- Victor Matthews in studio
- Born: 1963 (age 61–62); New York City, New York
- Known for: Painting, street art
- Website: victormatthews.com

Victor Matthews (born 1963) is an American painter born in New York City, who now shares his time between his birthplace and Los Angeles. He debuted with the support of the most important artists in NY's street-art scene in the eighties, and now is one of the leading figures of the contemporary art scene alongside Keith Haring, Francesco Clemente, Jean-Michel Basquiat, Donald Baechler, and Brice Marden.

== First works in New York during the eighties ==
Young Victor Matthews attended PS138 school in Brooklyn, New York. At his youngest age, he spent hours in his bedroom sketching any usual object that he could put his hands on. He naturally decided to study art, which led him from the High School of Art and Design to a Bachelor of Fine Arts obtained in 1985 at the Art Institute of Fort Lauderdale, before setting up his first studio in the East Village, Manhattan.

On the same year, he could spend his nights painting his first murals in lower Manhattan, which quickly earned him to be noticed by street art lovers. However at this time already, he had chosen to work with wall paint rather than spray paint, which is why he described his work as painting rather than graffiti. Since the mid 80s, he is part of a circle of iconic artists who greatly renewed the New York art scene, alongside the "godfather of street art" Richard Hambleton. Keith Haring taught him how to stretch canvas; Francesco Clemente showed him the use of watercolor; from Ross Bleckner he learned how to work with beeswax and "encaustic painting"; Donald Baechler inspired him with his strong sense of form simplicity; and Brice Marden told him about the use of the "Line" in painting.

== Artistic identity ==
Despite his street-art roots, Victor Matthews is a true studio artist. After a few years working with ink and pastel, Matthews slowly develops the technique and universe which now are his artistic signature. Most of his work is inspired by his birth city of New York, from which he extracts iconic elements (sneakers, pigeons, bikes, paved roads, bridges, water towers) that he draws in his paintings. Without any preliminary sketch, he lets himself being driven by the movement and rhythm of his hand to depict his own vision of NYC in a half-hieroglyphic, half-abstract style. Then it's a matter of balance between an often monochromatic taupe background, and of course his emblematic white paint, which dance together to tell a story with multiple layers that are typical of his personal iconography. According to Artweek magazine, Matthews creates "perfectly choreographed mosaic-like paintings of whitewashed and abstracted cityscapes."

As time goes by, and especially due to his frequent stays on the west coast, Victor Matthews' paintings get more abstract and organic. Spirituality also invites itself in his work as he continues to express his zen spirit, which he transcribes on the canvas using Buddhist and Hindu inspiration such as recurrent Third Eye and Tree of Life. Taupe backgrounds get also more nuances : under the Californian sky, the artist's paintings welcome color gradients, "tones" and "moods", which feel like the reflection of sunrises and sunsets on Los Angeles on his work.

== Exhibitions and collectors ==
Victor Matthews' often large-sized paintings were exhibited in an increasing number of galleries between 1985 and 1992, and then in all the United States. Germany, Italy, France, Saint-Barthélémy and many other countries would follow. The first peak of his career took place in 1999 with a first participation in the Venice Biennale (with Rene Cox), followed by a second appearance in 2013 (this time alongside Paolo Nicola Rossini). Gradually, Victor Matthews' universe got the attention of famous people from the show business and American entrepreneurship. Among the many collectors who acquired Matthews' work are also billionaires Donald Trump and Nathaniel Rothschild, former President of Botswana Festus Mogae, actor Forest Whitaker, author Salman Rushdie, and Ellen DeGeneres.

=== Selected exhibitions ===
- 2016
  - the milky way, LuxArtFair, Luxembourg
  - The Longest Road, KM Fine Arts, Los Angeles, CA
- 2015
  - Contemplations & Reflections, KM Fine Arts, Chicago, IL
  - Some thoughts and dreams, ST-ART Strasbourg, France
- 2014
  - bright... brighter... brightest, KM Fine Arts, Los Angeles, CA
- 2013
  - Transitions (with Paolo Nicola Rossini) - 55th Venice Biennale 2013, Italy
  - also shown at Boca Museum, Boca Raton, FL
- 2012
  - Winter Dreams, Space SBH, St Barthelemy
- 2011
  - The Vortex Paintings, deBuck Gallery, New York, NY
- 2010
  - Alter Ego Paintings, Wendt Gallery, New York, NY
- 2009
  - Champions of Modernism III, Wendt Gallery, Laguna Beach, CA
- 2008
  - Antarctica, Olivia On Warren, Hudson, NY
- 2007
  - Oliver Houg Gallery, Lyon, France
- 2006
  - Champions of Modernism II, Denise Bibro Fine Art, Inc., New York, NY
- 2005
  - Galerie Berinson, Berlin, Germany
- 2004
  - Trans Hudson Gallery, New York, NY
- 2002
  - Beyond Metamorphosis, between Piers 88-90, Battery Park, New York, NY
- 2001
  - Panther, a site-specific installation, Sculpture Center, Long Island City, NY
- 2000
  - Sala 1 – International Center for Contemporary Art – Rome, Italy
- 1999
  - 48th Venice Biennale, Venice, Italy
- 1998
  - Stephen Wirtz Gallery – San Francisco, CA
- 1996
  - Champions of Modernism, The Castle Gallery
  - College of New Rochelle, New Rochelle, NY
  - Mary Washington College Galleries, Fredericksburg, VA
  - Gibbes Museum of Art, Charleston, SC
  - Brevard Museum of Art and Science, Melbourne, FL
- 1995
  - Pink Innocence, Grand Salon, New York, NY
  - Stephen Wirtz Gallery, San Francisco, CA
  - Kantor Gallery, Los Angeles, CA
  - Paul Nievergilt, Zurich, Switzerland
- 1993
  - Drawing the Line Against AIDS, Guggenheim Museum, Venice, Italy
- 1992
  - Perry Rubenstein Gallery, New York, NY
- 1991
  - Tim Foley Gallery, New Orleans, LA
  - Tibor de Nagy, New York, NY
- 1988
  - Tower Gallery, New York, NY
  - Gallerie Sedjusehin, Konstanz, Germany
  - Gallerie Berenson, Berlin Germany
- 1987
  - Maurice Azoulay Gallery, Los Angeles, CA
- 1986
  - E.V. Gallery, New York, NY
  - Art et Industrie, New York, NY
  - Moda Exhibition Space, New York, NY
- 1985
  - Palladium East Village Show, New York, NY
  - Aesthetics Gallery, New York, NY
  - Sidney Janis Gallery, New York, NY
  - The National Afro-American Museum and Cultural Center, Wilberforce, OH

== Charity works ==
His educational background in public school has made Victor Matthews very sensitive to the cause of art projects involving children. He serves on the board of Rush Philanthropic Arts Foundation founded by his lifelong friend Russell Simmons and his brothers, and was involved in many projects with schools in New York and the Miami's Children Museum.
