= Parker Gispert =

American musician (born 1982)

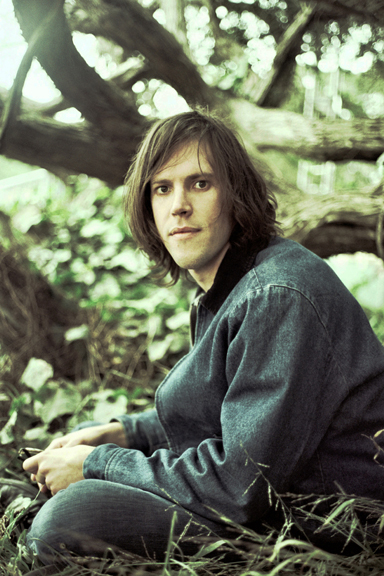
- Gispert in 2010

Background information
- Born: Parker Alan Gispert
- Genres: Rock and Roll, Singer-Songwriter
- Occupations: Musician, Artist, Entertainer
- Instruments: Vocals, Guitar, Piano
- Labels: ATO, New West, Normaltown, Kartel

Parker Gispert (born May 24, 1982) is the lead singer of The Whigs. He is a native of Atlanta, Georgia, United States, a 2001 graduate of The Westminster Schools, and a 2006 graduate of the University of Georgia with a degree in philosophy. Parker's first solo album Sunlight Tonight was released in November 2018 and his most recent album "Golden Years" in 2022.

== The Whigs ==
=== (2001-present) ===
The Whigs were formed in 2002 by Gispert, Julian Dorio, and Hank Sullivant in Athens, Georgia. The band toured the world consistently from 2005-2015 as headliners and as openers for the likes of Kings of Leon, Black Keys, Black Rebel Motorcycle Club, and Jason Isbell. The band also appeared on The Tonight Show with Jay Leno twice, the Late Show with David Letterman four times, Late Night with Conan O'Brien, Late Night with Jimmy Fallon, and Jimmy Kimmel Live! twice. They have released five studio albums, one live album, and are Signed to Dave Matthews label ATO Records and New West Records.

== Solo career ==
=== (2018-present) ===
Sunlight Tonight, Parker's first album as a solo artist was released in November 2018 by the New West Records subsidiary Normaltown Records. Produced, Mixed, and Engineered by Grammy Award winner Emery Dobyns (Antony and The Johnsons, Patti Smith), the album includes contributions from Patrick Carney (Black Keys), Sol Seppy (Sparklehorse), Samul Dixon (Adele), and Faye Webster among others. Parker supported the album by a headline club tour and support tours for Valerie June, SUSTO, RNDM, and Futurebirds. Parker co-wrote "Private Public Breakdown" with Alice Cooper and producer Bob Ezrin which appears on the Alice Cooper album Paranormal.

"Golden Years", Parker's second album was co-produced by Gispert and Roger Moutenot (Lou Reed, Yo La Tengo, John Cale) and released September 22, 2022 on New West Records.

== Discography ==
=== Studio albums ===
- Sunlight Tonight (New West / Normaltown Records)(2018)
- Golden Years (New West / Normaltown Records)(2022)

=== Studio Albums w/ The Whigs ===
- Give 'Em All a Big Fat Lip (ATO Records) (2005)
- Mission Control(ATO Records) (2008)
- In the Dark (ATO Records) (2010)
- Enjoy the Company (New West Records) (2012)
- Modern Creation (New West Records) (2014)

=== Live Albums w/ The Whigs ===
- Live In Little Five (New West Records)(2016)

=== Singles w/ The Whigs ===
- "Like a Vibration" b/w "That's A Lot To Live Up To" (demo) (7", 2008) ATO Records
- "Right Hand on My Heart" (2008) No. 40 Billboard Hot Modern Rock Tracks
- "Kill Me Carolyne" (2010) ATO Records
- "Hundred / Million" (2010) Kartel Records (UK / Euro)
- "So Lonely" (2010) b/w "Gimme Gimme Shock Treatment (The Ramones) Kartel Records (UK / Euro)
- "Waiting" b/w "Don't Know What We're Doing" (7", 2012) New West Records
- "Staying Alive" (radio edit) (2013) New West Records
- "Hit Me" (radio edit) (2014) New West Records
