= Julian Dorio =

American drummer (born 1981)

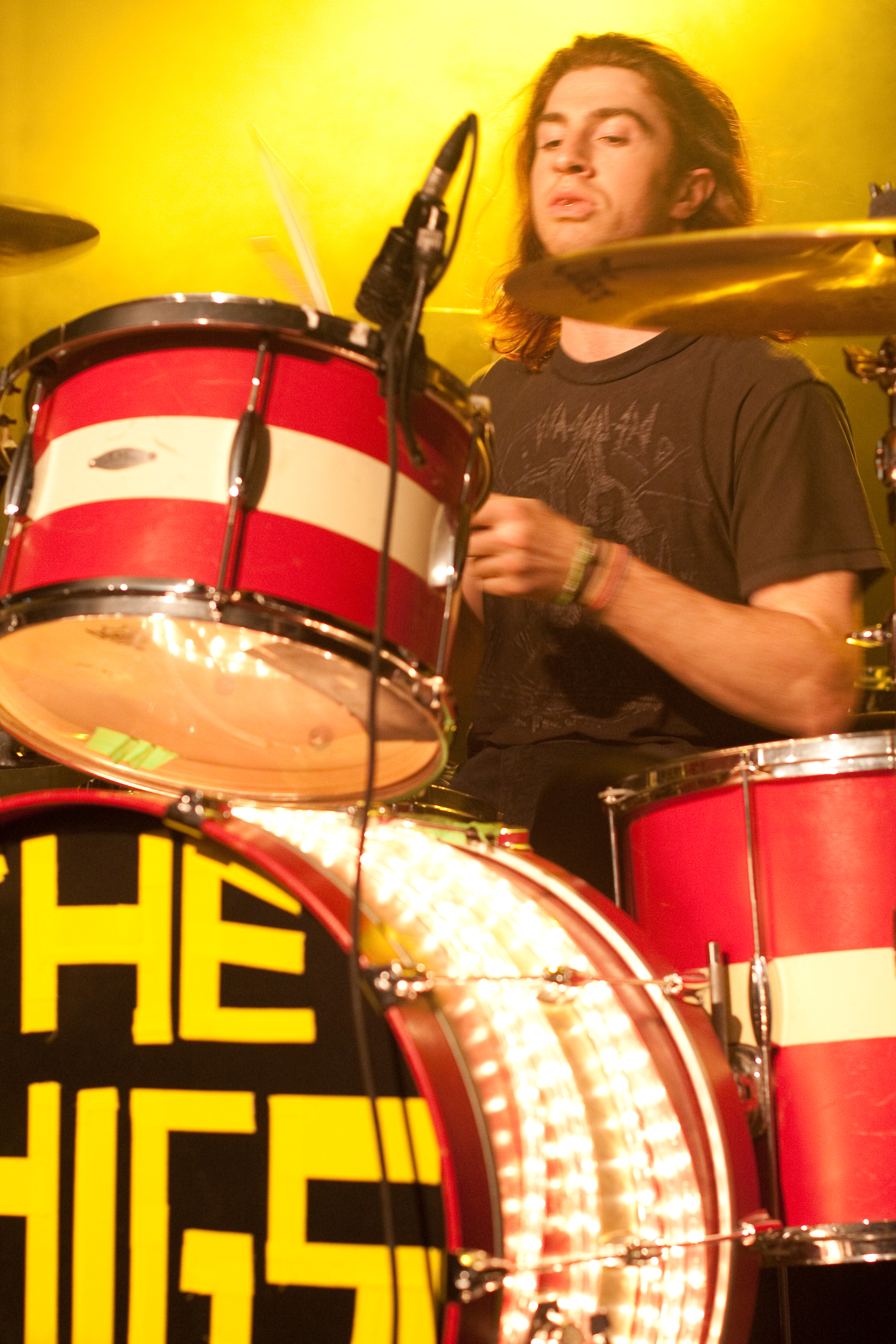
- Ottawa, Canada. April 2010

Background information
- Born: November 26, 1981 (age 44); Atlanta, Georgia

Julian Dorio (born November 26, 1981) is an American drummer. He is a founding member of the rock band The Whigs.

== Biography ==
Julian started drumming at the age of 6, as an original member of the Flying Dorios. The band included his father and his older brother, Michael Dorio of Trances Arc. A high school graduate of The Westminster Schools in Atlanta and a college graduate of the University of Georgia, Dorio currently resides in Nashville, Tennessee.

The Whigs was signed to their current record label, Dave Matthews' ATO, in 2006. He has been featured in Drum Magazine and Modern Drummer. The Whigs were also invited to perform on the Late Show with David Letterman on January 28, 2008, and Late Night with Conan O'Brien on February 20, 2008.

== Career ==
Julian is the drummer for, and a founding member of, The Whigs, a garage rock band out of Athens, Georgia.

In March 2007, Julian Dorio was awarded an Esky award for "Best Drummer" by Esquire magazine.

In the fall of 2015, Dorio briefly toured with Eagles of Death Metal. He was drumming for the band at the Bataclan theatre in Paris during the terrorist attacks in November 2015. All band members survived the attacks.

Julian has been a touring member of the band The Lone Bellow since their founding but wasn't a credited member of the band until the release of their album "Love Songs for Losers" in 2022. Since then, he has recorded and intermittently toured with the band, in some cases splitting his time between touring for both The Lone Bellow and Stephen Wilson Jr.

As of 2026, Dorio is the studio and touring drummer for country and rock singer and songwriter Stephen Wilson Jr.
