= Coronation Concert =

Music concert held outside Windsor Castle, commemorating King Charles III's coronation

- Commemoration concert by various artists
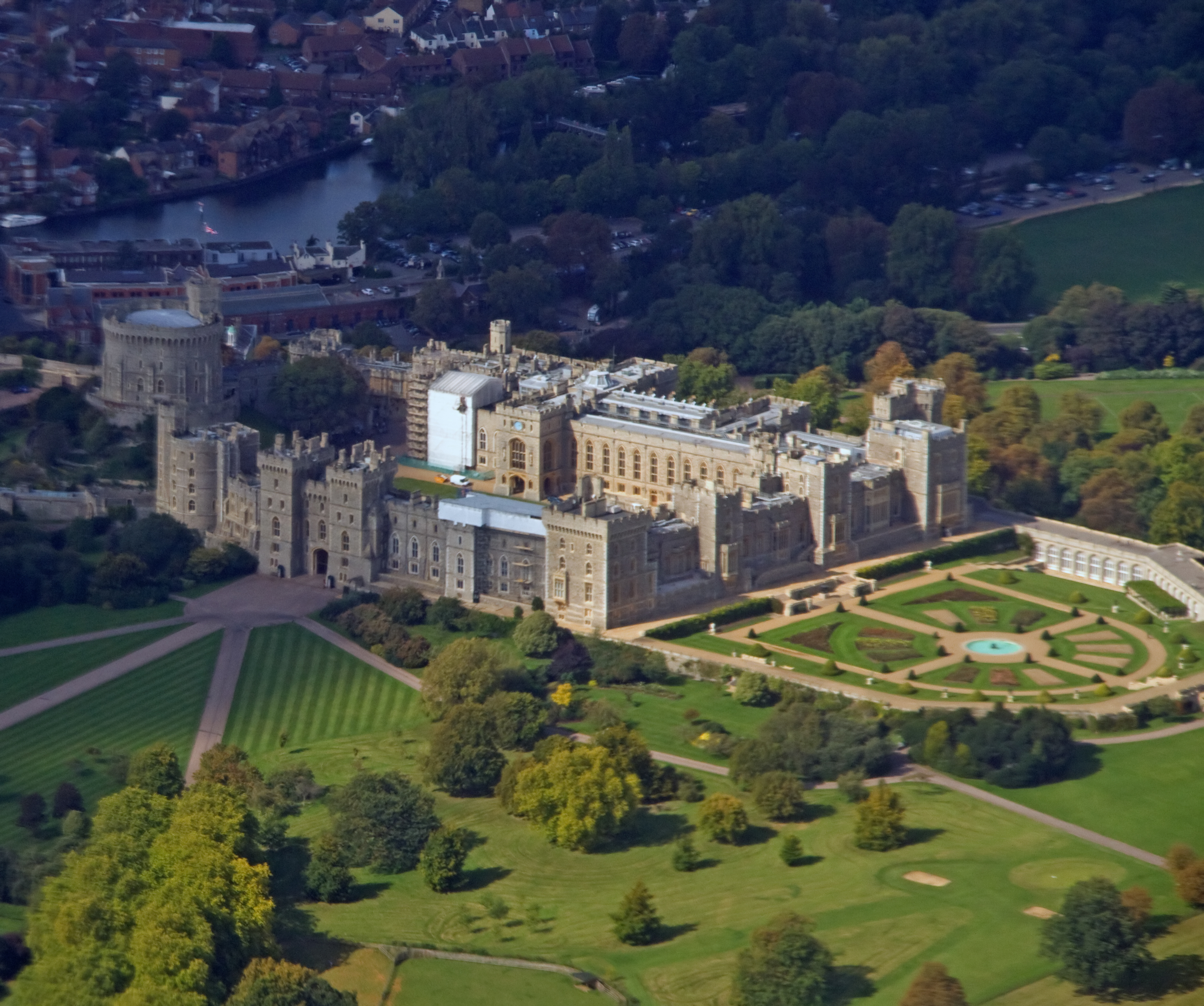
- Windsor Castle, venue for the concert
- Venue: Windsor Castle
- Date: 7 May 2023
- Duration: 124 minutes (televised programme)
- Producer: BBC Studios Events Productions
- Attendance: 20,000

The Coronation Concert was a British music concert, held outside Windsor Castle on 7 May 2023, in celebration of the coronation of King Charles III and Queen Camilla. The concert, which was attended by 20,000 members of the public, took place between 20:30 and 22:04 (BST) and was hosted by actor Hugh Bonneville. The Prince of Wales paid tribute to his father in a short speech.

== Production and ticketing ==
The "Coronation Concert" was held at Windsor Castle's East Lawn. The BBC produced, staged, and broadcast the event. A national ballot was held between 10 and 28 February to distribute 5,000 pairs of free tickets for the public based on the geographical spread of the UK population. Volunteers from the King and Queen's charities were also among the audience.

The event was broadcast in over 100 countries. The stage enveloped the castle's parapet wall and featured multiple levels and four catwalks. The overall shape resembled that of an abstracted Union Jack. A halo-like screen was placed above the main stage, enveloping the roof, which symbolised the Crown protecting the nation.

It was reported that all the acts performed "for free". BBC studios provided a hair and make-up team, but those artists who wanted to bring their own had to fund them themselves. Both Katy Perry and Lionel Richie were believed to have travelled to the UK by private jet.

== Performances ==
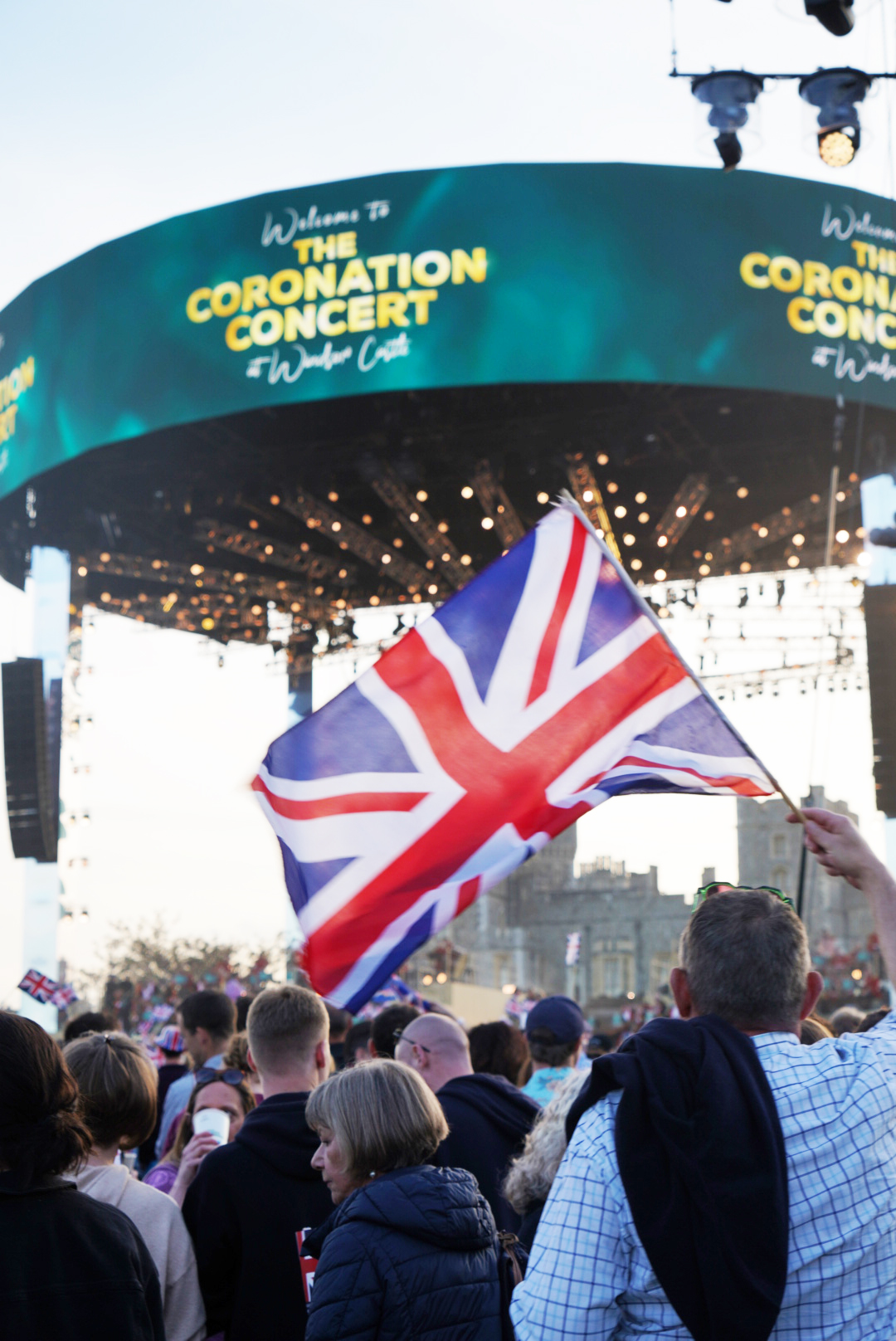
The concert at Windsor Castle

The concert featured performances from artists including The Household Division Orchestra of the British Army conducted by Lt Col David Barringer MVO MBE, Katy Perry, Lionel Richie, Andrea Bocelli, Sir Bryn Terfel, Alexis Ffrench, Zak Abel, Take That featuring Robin Schulz and Calum Scott, Paloma Faith, Tiwa Savage, Steve Winwood, Lang Lang, Nicole Scherzinger, Olly Murs, Pete Tong, and Sonam Kapoor.

Tom Cruise, Dame Joan Collins, Winnie-the-Pooh, Piglet, Kermit the Frog, Miss Piggy, Sir Tom Jones, Hugh Jackman, Alan Titchmarsh, Richard E. Grant, Pierce Brosnan, Bear Grylls, Dynamo, Tracey Emin, Giovanna Fletcher, and Oti Mabuse appeared in a series of pre-recorded sketches and segments. In addition to performances by singers, musicians, and stage and screen actors, the show also featured the 300-voice "Coronation Choir", mentored by Gareth Malone, composed of community choirs and amateur singers such as refugee choirs, NHS choirs, LGBTQ+ singing groups, and deaf signing choirs.

The Royal Ballet, The Royal Opera, the Royal Shakespeare Company, the Royal College of Music and the Royal College of Art also performed together with actors Ncuti Gatwa and Mei Mac and ballet dancers Francesca Hayward and Marcelino Sambé.

Spoken word performances on the night were delivered by designer Stella McCartney and actor James Nesbitt, the latter reading a spoken word piece written for the occasion by Daljit Nagra, Chair of the Royal Society of Literature.

Freya Ridings pulled out of the concert due to illness and was replaced by Zak Abel.

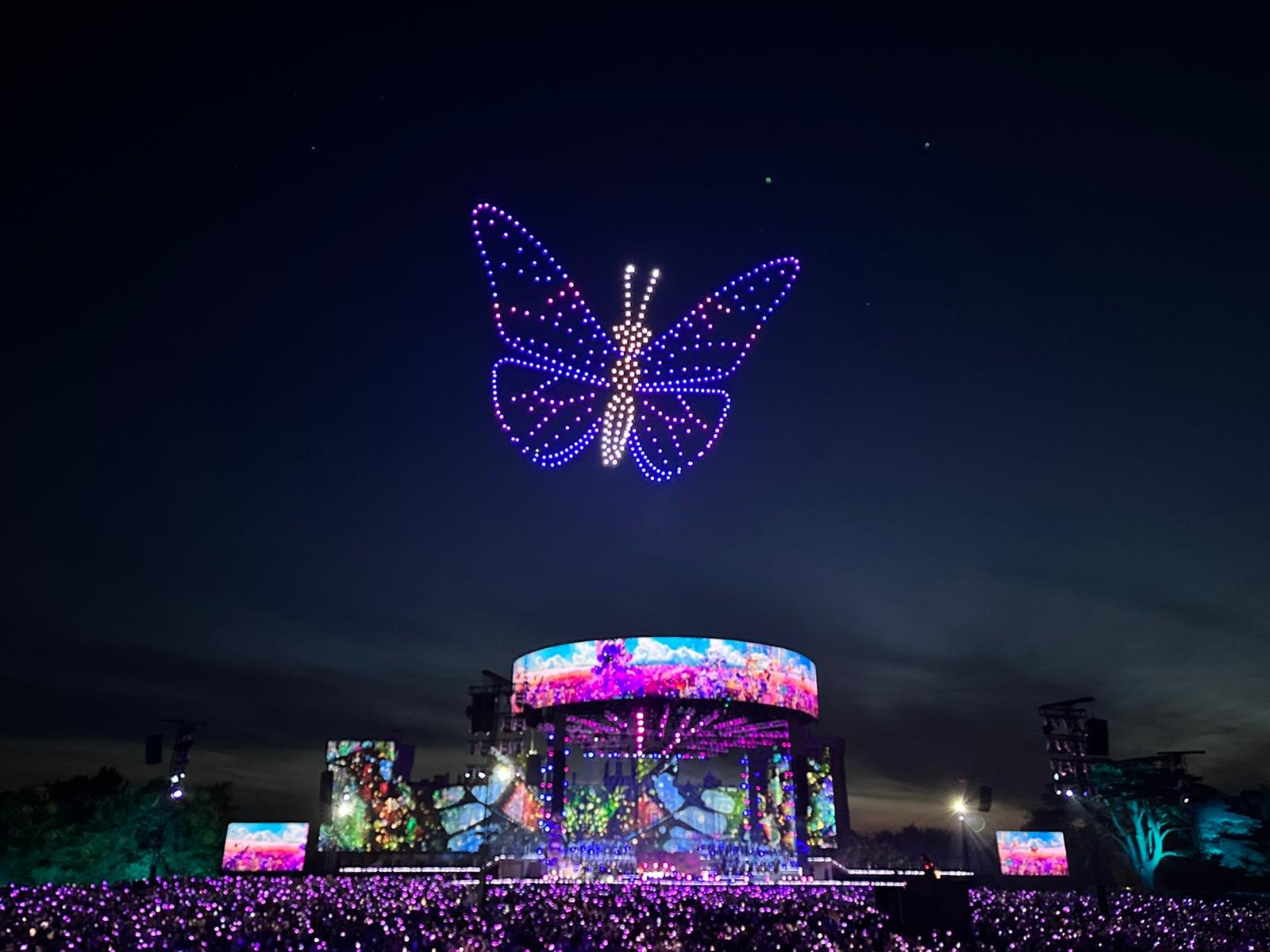
Drone show during the concert

During the performance of the Simple Minds song "Don't You (Forget About Me)", by Alexis Ffrench and Zak Abel, colourful drone displays took place above the stage at Windsor and at other venues across the country. The drones formed together to create different animals and moments in nature, including a blue whale, a bumblebee, a butterfly, a heron and a rabbit.

== Setlist ==
The concert performances, in order, were:

- Pete Tong – "Feel the Love"
- Olly Murs – "Dance with Me Tonight"
- The Coronation Choir – "Brighter Days”
- Lang Lang and Nicole Scherzinger – "Reflection"
- The Royal Collaboration with Ncuti Gatwa and Mei Mac – "Somewhere"
- Lucy Illingworth – Bach Prelude in C Major
- Steve Winwood and the Commonwealth Choir – "Higher Love"
- Tiwa Savage – "Keys to the Kingdom"
- Andrea Bocelli, Sir Bryn Terfel, Carla Maffioletti, Carmen Monarcha, Mirusia and The Platin Tenors – "You'll Never Walk Alone"
- Lionel Richie – "Easy", "All Night Long (All Night)"
- Paloma Faith – "Lullaby"
- Alexis Ffrench – "Guiding Light", "Don't You (Forget About Me)" (featuring Zak Abel)
- Katy Perry – "Roar", "Firework"
- Take That – "Greatest Day" (featuring Robin Schulz and Calum Scott), "Shine", "Never Forget"

== Guests ==
=== Royal family ===
- The King and Queen
  - The Prince and Princess of Wales
    - Prince George of Wales
    - Princess Charlotte of Wales
- The Princess Royal's family:
  - Peter Phillips and Lindsay Wallace
    - Savannah Phillips
    - Isla Phillips
  - Zara and Michael Tindall
- The Duke of York and Sarah, Duchess of York
  - Princess Beatrice and Edoardo Mapelli Mozzi
  - Princess Eugenie and Jack Brooksbank
- The Duke and Duchess of Edinburgh
  - Lady Louise Mountbatten-Windsor
  - Earl of Wessex
- The Princess Margaret, Countess of Snowdon's family:
  - The Earl of Snowdon
    - Viscount Linley
    - Lady Margarita Armstrong-Jones
  - Lady Sarah and Daniel Chatto
    - Samuel Chatto
- The Duke and Duchess of Gloucester
- The Duke of Kent
- Prince and Princess Michael of Kent

=== Other ===
- The Baroness Scotland of Asthal, Commonwealth Secretary-General
- Prime Minister Rishi Sunak and Akshata Murty
- Sir Keir Starmer, Leader of the Opposition
- Mary Simon, Governor General of Canada
- Crown Prince Pavlos and Crown Princess Marie-Chantal of Greece
- Amanda Holden, media personality, actress and singer

== Reception ==
Overnight viewing figures indicated the concert had an average audience of 10.1 million, peaking at 12.3 million.
