= Ewandro Stenzowski =

Brazilian operatic tenor (born 1984)

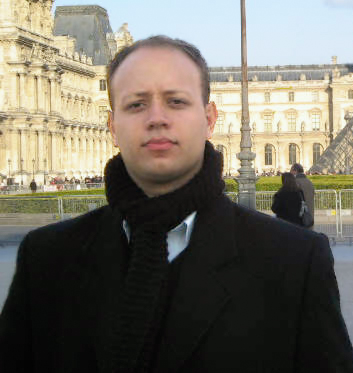
- Stenzowski in 2007
- Born: September 27, 1984 (age 41); Curitiba, Paraná
- Other names: Ewandro Cruz Stenzowski
- Education: Master of Music in opera performance; Bachelor of Music in lyric singing
- Alma mater: University of the State of Paraná; University of Rio de Janeiro; University of Music Stuttgart
- Occupation: operatic tenor
- Years active: 2000–present
- Website: www.stenzowski.com

Ewandro Stenzowski (born September 27, 1984) is a Brazilian operatic tenor and veteran of the Brazilian Marine Corps. He appeared in concerts and leading tenor roles in South America and Europe.

== Biography ==
Ewandro Cruz Stenzowski was born in Curitiba, Brazil on September 27, 1984. In Brazil, he earned a Bachelor of Music degree in lyric singing from the Federal University of Rio de Janeiro. He received his Master of Music in opera performance and Solistenexamen in Germany, at the State University of Music and Performing Arts Stuttgart.

== Career and education ==
=== Brazil ===
Stenzowski started his singing studies with mezzo-soprano Denise Sartori at the age of 14. In 1999, at age 15, he became the youngest student in the singing program of the School of Music and Fine Arts of Paraná as a student of Lázaro Wenger and Denise Sartori, and made his debut as a concert singer with 16 at II Festival Municipal da Canção Ecológica (FEMUCE) in Pinhais, Paraná. Three years later, in 2002, he received the encouragement award Prêmio Estímulo for young singers in the Bidu Sayão International Vocal Competition at only 17 years old. Jury member Luca Targetti, then casting director at La Scala, encouraged Stenzowski to go to Italy and attend masterclasses with Carlo Bergonzi.

In 2006 he performed in the Brazilian premiere of the Gilbert and Sullivan opera Trial by Jury. The same year he joined the Marine Corps of the Brazilian Navy. During his time in the Marine Corps, he continued to sing in competitions. In the following year he won the VIII. Villa-Lobos National Singing Contest (Concurso Nacional de Canto Villa-Lobos, 2007) in Vitória, and third place, best male voice, and the Radió MEC prize in the Francisco Mignone National Contest (Concurso Nacional Francisco Mignone, 2007). Starting in 2008 he became a student of Cilene Fadigas and Nelson Portella at Federal University of Rio de Janeiro, while still in the Navy.

In 2009, Stenzowski recorded Schumann's song cycle Dichterliebe for Rádio MEC. In 2010 he concluded his studies at University of Rio de Janeiro with a bachelor's degree, won the Carlos Gomes competition in Campinas and made his debut at the Theatro Municipal with Janáček's The Makropulos Affair and a concert version of Il Guarany by Antônio Carlos Gomes. Though his Navy service concluded in 2010, he appeared in concert with the Marine Corps Orchestra of Brazil in Theatro Municipal in May 2011.

=== Europe ===
Also in 2011 he was a finalist in the international competition Klassik Mania held in Vienna and started studying for his Master of Music degree in Germany at the State University of Music and Performing Arts Stuttgart as a student of Ulrike Sonntag. He made his European operatic debut as Peter Quint in Brittens The Turn of The Screw in the Wilhelma-Theater in Stuttgart. In the 2012/2013 season, Stenzowski became a member of the International Opera Studio at the Staatsoper Stuttgart. Here he appeared as Hrázda in Janáček's Osud, Flavio in Bellini's Norma, Abdallo in Verdi's Nabucco, the Second Priest in Mozart's Die Zauberflöte, and the Officer in Strauss' Ariadne auf Naxos.

In 2014 he appeared as Stewa Buryja in Janáček's Jenůfa and Nemorino in Donizetti's L'elisir d'amore as a guest at the Landestheater Detmold in North Rhine-Westphalia, before joining the Detmold opera ensemble with begin of the 2014/2015 season. With this ensemble, he performed again as the Second Priest in Die Zauberflöte, as Cassio in Verdi's Otello, and Narraboth in Salome. In Summer 2015 Stenzowski made his debut as Canio in Leoncavallo's Pagliacci at the open air opera festival in Nürtingen, followed by further debuts in Detmold as Rodolfo in Puccini's La bohème, Alfred in Die Fledermaus by Johann Strauss, Aegisth in Elektra by Richard Strauss, Virginio in the world premiere of Sogno d'un mattino di primavera by Alexander Muno, Kunz Vogelsang in Wagner's Die Meistersinger von Nürnberg, the Duke of Mantua in Verdi's Rigoletto, Erik in Wagner's Der fliegende Holländer, and Mario Cavaradossi in Puccini's Tosca.

Stenzowski left the ensemble of the Landestheater Detmold in 2018, and made his debut at Teatro Petruzzelli, again as Erik in Der fliegende Holländer. He rejoined the Detmold ensemble briefly to sing Cavaradossi in the final performance of Tosca with Megan Marie Hart. In Summer 2019 he sang the Podestá Don Anchise in Mozart's La finta giardiniera in the Theater Heilbronn production for the Bundesgartenschau 2019. In 2020 Stenzowski sang Macduff in Verdi's Macbeth at Theater Gießen, arranged for 11 piece orchestra to increase the distance between musicians in the ongoing COVID-19 pandemic. In 2021 he sang Erik in Der fliegende Holländer with the Orchestre national d'Île-de-France at Opéra de Massy, and the Prince and the Manservant in Berg's Lulu in a livestream from Theater Heidelberg, as well as in the subsequent premiere with audience in 2022. In the summer he sang in the staged operetta concert Villa Lehár at the Zomeropera festival in the Alden Biesen Castle, and returned to the role of Aeghist in a new staging of Elektra by Giancarlo del Monaco at Theater Erfurt. In 2023 he sang one of the students from Wittenberg and Megäros in Busoni's Doktor Faust at the Teatro del Maggio Musicale Fiorentino in Florence under conductor Cornelius Meister.

In addition to master classes with Carlo Bergonzi in Italy early in his education, Stenzowski attended master classes with Malcom Walker at Conservatoire de Paris, Shirley Close at Florida State University, Peter Berne and Chris Merritt in Germany, Graciela Araya in Chile, Neyde Thomaz in Brazil and Helen York at Manhattan School of Music.

== Recordings ==
Year	Title	Work	Composer	Artists
2010	Ofício 1816 e Missa Pastoril	Ofício dos Defuntos (CPM 108); Missa Pastoril para a Noite de Natal (CPM 186)	José Maurício Nunes Garcia	Choir and orchestra of Cia. Bachiana Brasileira; Paloma Lima, soprano; Carolina Faria, mezzo-soprano; Ewandro Stenzowski, tenor; Pedro Olivero, bass; Michele Menezes, soprano; Ana Cecília Rebelo, soprano; Ricardo Rocha, conductor
2011	Lecture Concerts: Lecture 2: Cantata "Christ unser Herr zum Jordan kam" BWV 7	Christ unser Herr zum Jordan kam (Cantata BWV 7)	Johann Sebastian Bach	Daniel Raschinsky, bass; Ewandro Stenzowski, tenor; Dann Coakwell, tenor; Edwing Tenias, bass; Felicity Smith, alto; Helmuth Rilling, conductor
2014	César Franck: Die sieben letzten Worte Jesu am Kreuz	Les Sept Paroles du Christ sur la Croix	César Franck	Mainzer Domchor and Domorchester; Karsten Storck, conductor; Daniel Beckmann, organ; Inga-Britt Andersson, soprano; Ewandro Stenzowski, tenor; Christian Rathgeber, tenor; Sebastian Pilgrim, bass
