= Ziesjoem =

Ziesjoem!

Background information
- Origin: Maastricht, Netherlands
- Genres: Folk Music/Popular Music
- Years active: 1986–present
- Members: Marly Van Herpen, Jos Van Herpen, Roger Stijns
- Past members: Mario Verhoeven; Ingrid Paulussen; Henny Slangen; Eric Slangen; Karen Groot; Carl Vroemen; Kees Severins; Margo Severins
- Website: Ziesjoem.nl

Ziesjoem, stylized with an exclamation mark as Ziesjoem! (pronounced: ZEE-SHOOM), are a Dutch music group of folk songs and popular music from Maastricht in the Netherlands. The group are locally known for their catchy, singalong music style and their costuming themes. The group currently consists of Marly Van Herpen, Jos Van Herpen and Roger Stijns.

== History ==
=== Formation and Vol mèt goud gelaoje (Loaded Full with Gold) ===
Originally, the group consisted of six members: Mario Verhoeven, Ingrid Paulussen, Henny and Eric Hoses and Marly and Jos van Herpen.

Jos van Herpen started as a singer on the boats of Rederij Stiphout in Maastricht. Eventually, he asked a few acquaintances to join his singing act, forming Ziesjoem! in 1986 and starting out performing sea shanties accompanied by a live orchestra. The sea shanties were replaced over time by their own songs in Maastrichts; the matching costumes, however, remained. Due to the difficulty of having a live orchestra on hand during performances, Ziesjoem used music recorded in a studio, which most often occurred at performances away from the boats they performed on. As their popularity grew with audiences, their manager Nico van Wieringen who had also started his own recording company, CL Productions in Maastricht, arranged for their first record in his studio Vol mèt goud gelaoje (Galleon Full of Gold), referring to the groups pirate theme at the time. The group became popular during the Maastricht carnival when they won the Mestreechs Vastelaovendsleedsje in 1996 with the song "Drei daog laank verlore".

=== Second album and breakthrough ===
Ziesjoem's great change came when they were asked to record their second album by Dutch record company 'Marlstone music', titled "Is dat daan niks Merie?" (Has that settled nothing Merie?). The album also included their biggest hit song "Zjuulke Zeuthout", which is still requested today.

The record, along with winning a competition award provided Ziesjoem with the breakthrough they needed, also winning another competition award with song: "Drei daog laank verlore" by Dutch artists Marc Quaaden & Peter Ruijters, however the group was accused of a plagiarism scandal. Karen and Henny eventually left, however fellow singers Kees & Margo Severins were often asked to sing with the group. Karen remained an active role with Ziesjoem as a treasurer. Ziesjoem continued to perform at live events, and also participated in a Limburg singing competition with a number "Tien Vinger in 1998 de Loch" (Ten Fingers in the Air), making it to the finals. In the summer of 2011, Ziesjoem! performed together with André Rieu during the concerts at the Vrijthof in Maastricht.

Eric Hoses, unable to combine performances with his own busy agenda eventually left the group. Also with the exit of Ingrid Paulussen, came Karen Young to the group. The popularity of Ziesjoem continued to grow with boat appearances decreasing and the number of theatre performances increasing. Eventually Ziesjoem became well known with television and newspaper appearances, their music was played in bars and on the radio.

Eventually band member Mario Verhoeven left, unable to combine performances with family and work, and so singer Carl Vroemen joined the group. Ziesjoem recorded their third album, "Lekker Menneke" (Handsome Man) which also proved a huge hit with its title song "Lekker Menneke". In 1988 Ziesjoem expanded publicity with the launch of their website. The attention of L1 TV in the Netherlands was soon attracted who wanted Ziesjoem to play a group of pirates for a 6-part education program on pollution. Ziesjoem was also later featured in comic style strips drawn by Peter Hermans.

=== Later history ===
An important aspect, and iconic feature of Ziesjoem are their costumes. When they formed in 1986, they formed a pirate theme with pirate-like clothing. In 1995, their costumes were re-designed, and have since then continued so with a colour or theme every 2–3 years.

In 2003, Ziesjoem celebrated their 15-year anniversary and organised the "Fries Festival" in Maastricht, referring to their hit "Friete" on their last album "Zjiemelezjo". The 2003 festival proved a great success and in 2004 another was organised in the form of a German "Bratwurst Festival". In that year, an album was made compiling their best records remastered. In 2005 they released another album "Da Maon" (The Moon) with known song "1001 Nach" on the album, one their most recent until 2008. Ziesjoem also changed their theme style, dressing as Russian tsars.

In 2009, Margo, Kees and Carl decided to leave the group, Marly and Jos decided to search for a new Ziesjoem member, which eventually was Roger Stijns. They rebranded themselves in a new form of country western theme. In that year Ziesjoem also recorded another album "Noe brant the lamp" (Don't Break the Lamp), which featured hit song "Lena".

In 2011, Ziesjoem celebrated their 25th anniversary, in June their publicity came even greater as they performed with world-famous violinist, and Maastrichtian André Rieu. and his Johann Strauss Orchestra at a live concert in Maastricht, which was also broadcast live to cinemas around the world. Their performance proved a great success, especially their number "Zjuulke Zeuthout". In October they further celebrated with their concert Ziesjoem Circus!.

== See also ==
- Music of the Netherlands
