= Maastricht Academy of Music =

Music school in Maastricht, Netherlands

Coordinates: 50°50′42″N 5°41′13″E

- Conservatorium Maastricht
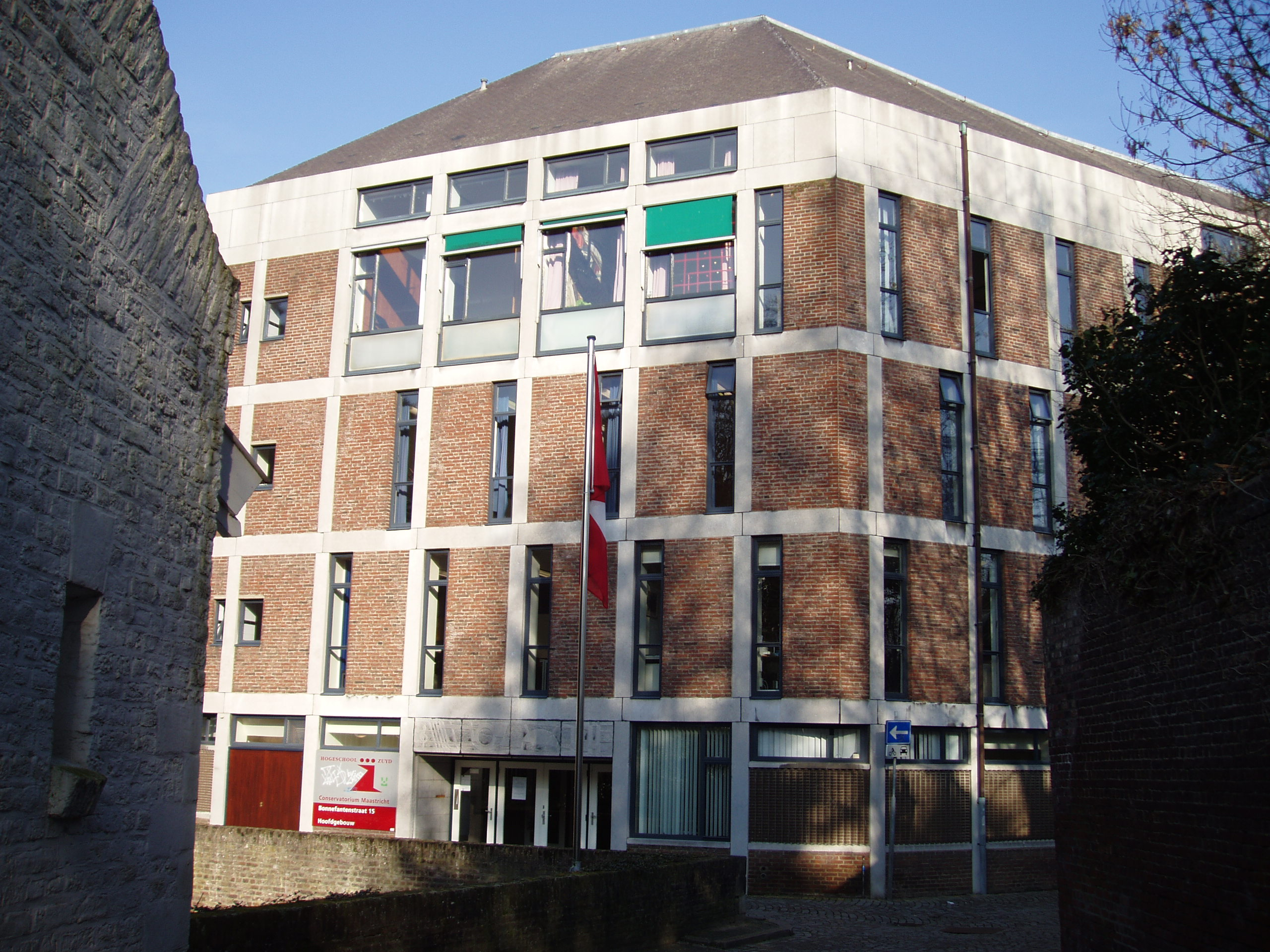
- Type: Public
- Established: 1962
- Affiliations: AEC European Association of Conservatoires - ELIA European League of Institutes of the Arts
- Rector: Joachim Junghanss
- Administrative staff: 135
- Students: 600
- Undergraduates: 350 (and 100 pre-college)
- Postgraduates: 140
- Location: Maastricht, Netherlands
- Campus: Urban
- Website: https://www.conservatoriummaastricht.nl/en

The Maastricht Academy of Music, Dutch: Conservatorium Maastricht, located in the city of Maastricht, is one of nine music academies in the Netherlands. The academy is a faculty of the Zuyd University of Applied Sciences (Hogeschool Zuyd in Dutch) for the Bachelor programme and the "Zuid Nederlandse Hogeschool voor Muziek" for the Master programme, in co-operation with the Fontys Academy of Music and Performing Arts. The academy provides advanced vocational training.

The music academy collaborates with the two other art faculties of the Zuyd University: the Maastricht Academy of Dramatic Arts and the Maastricht Academy of Fine Arts and with the Faculty of Arts and Culture of Maastricht University.

== Programs and degrees offered ==
The Maastricht Academy of Music has departments for European classical music, Jazz, Musical composition, and Opera. The academy proposes a 4 years Bachelor's programme (BMus and BMus ed.) and a two years Master's programme (MMus).

From 2009, the Maastricht Academy of Music will offer a joint master's degree with the Maastricht University.

== International orientation ==
The number of foreign students is ca. 65% from more than 45 countries and many international members of teaching staff. The principal language of education is English and Dutch students may request to take exams in Dutch.

The academy collaborates and has international exchange programmes with leadings music schools in Europe, such as the Hochschule für Musik Köln (Cologne), (Germany); the Royal Conservatory of Brussels (Belgium); the Universität für Musik und darstellende Kunst Wien; and the Universität für Musik und darstellende Kunst Graz (Austria).

== History ==
- 1962: Founding of the academy.
- 1965: New building at Bonnenfantenstraat 15, Maastricht (architect: P.H. Dingemans).
- 2001: The academy becomes a faculty of the Zuyd University.
- 200?: Creation of the Zuid Nederlandse Hogeschool voor Muziek for the Postgraduate programme in co-operation with the Fontys Conservatorium.
- 2009: Start of a joint master's degree with the Maastricht University.

== Festivals and competitions ==
Since 1990, the Conservatorium organizes an annual festival. Themes were:

- 2005: Korea
- 2006: Shostakovich and Lutyens
- 2007: Schubert | Webern

Since 2001, the conservatorium organizes the Music Awards Maastricht, an annual competition, in collaboration with the Rotary International.

== Conservatorium Maastricht people ==
=== Faculty ===
- Boris Belkin: Violin
- Michael Kugel: Viola
- Robert HP Platz: Composition
- Carlo Marchione: Guitar
- Will Sanders: Horn
- Avi Schönfeld: Piano
- Robert Szreder: Violin

=== Alumni ===
- Marc Clear, singer
- Marcin Dylla, guitarist
- Margriet Ehlen, composer and conductor
- Turid Karlsen, soprano
- Goran Krivokapić, guitarist
- Marjon Lambriks, soprano
- André Rieu, violinist and conductor
- Will Sanders, horn player
- Glenn Corneille, jazz pianist
- Carmen Monarcha, singer
- David Satian, composer and jazz pianist
- Carla Maffioletti, singer
