= Johann Strauss Orchestra =

Dutch pops orchestra founded by André Rieu in 1987

- Pops orchestra
- Founded: 1987
- Location: Maastricht, Netherlands
- Concert hall: Vrijthof
- Principal conductor: André Rieu
- Website: andrerieu.com/the-johann-strauss-orchestra

The Johann Strauss Orchestra is a pops orchestra founded in the Netherlands by André Rieu in 1987. The orchestra is known for performing arrangements of classical and popular music, often incorporating comedic antics.

== Performances and recordings ==
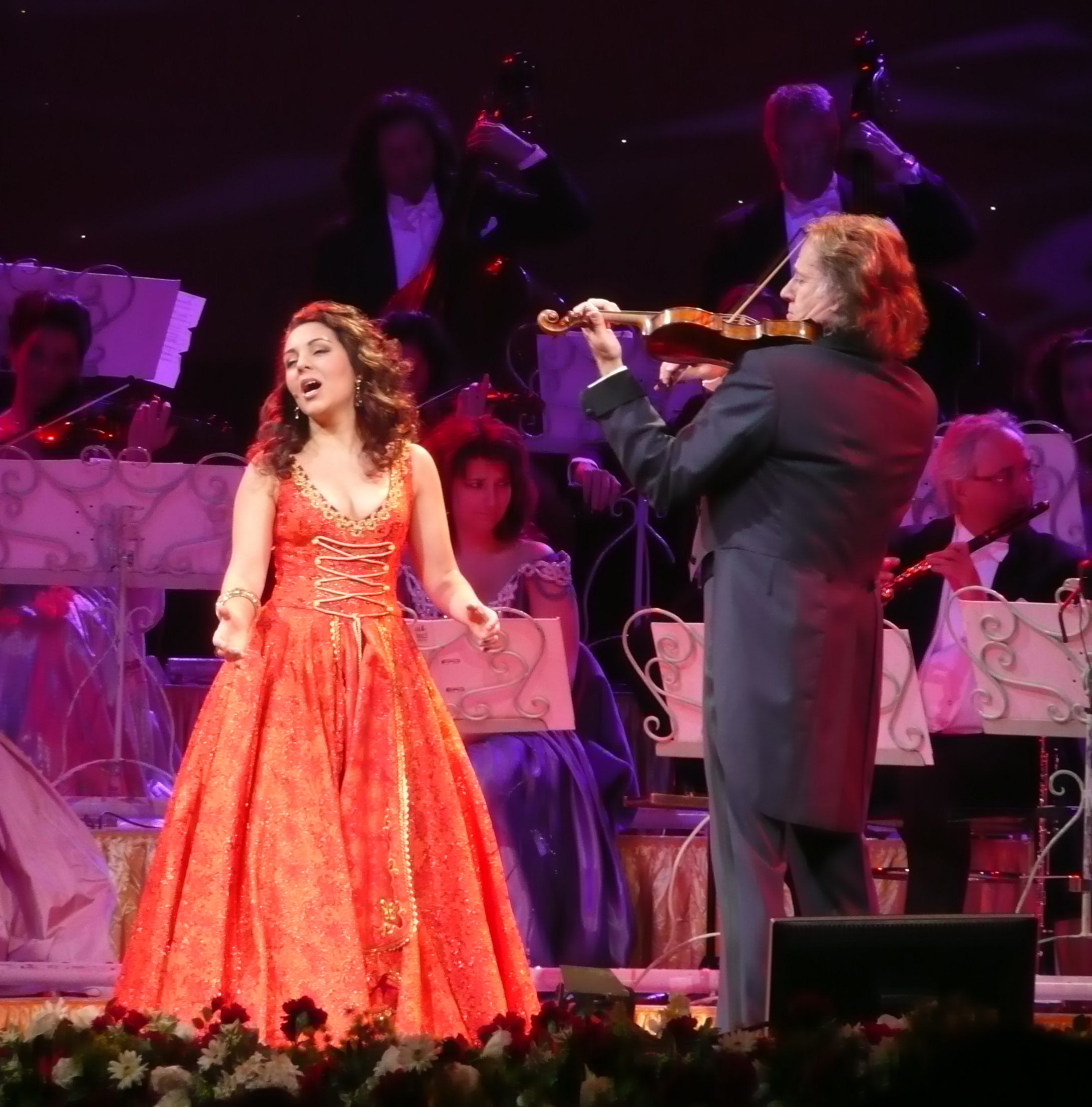
Andre Rieu and Carmen Monarcha accompanied by the Johann Strauss Orchestra

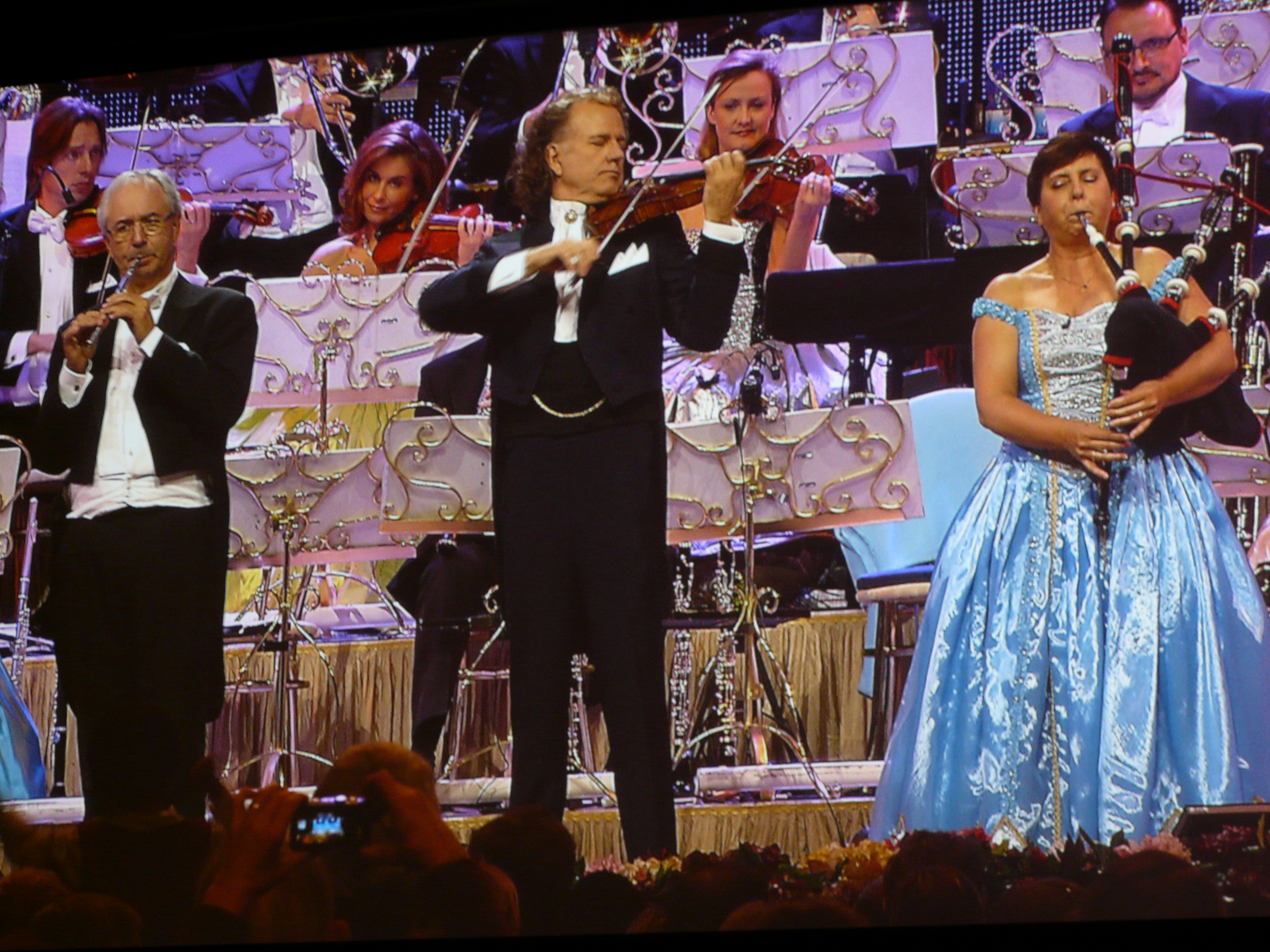
Johann Strauss Orchestra performing at the Ziggo Dome, Amsterdam

Rieu and his orchestra have performed throughout Europe, in North America, Japan, and Australia. Winning a number of awards, including two World Music Awards, their recordings have gone gold and platinum in many countries, including eight-time platinum in the Netherlands.

At Rieu's studios in Maastricht, the orchestra has recorded a range of classical, popular and folk music, and music from cinema and musical theatre. His lively orchestral presentations, in tandem with effective marketing, have attracted worldwide audiences to this subgenre of classical music.

Some of the orchestra's performances have been broadcast in the United Kingdom on Sky Arts and the United States on the PBS television network such as the 2003 airing of Andre Rieu Live in Dublin, filmed in Dublin, Ireland, and 2003's André Rieu Live in Tuscany filmed in the Piazza Della Repubblica in the village of Cortona in Tuscany.

== History ==
Gemma Serpenti and André Rieu founded the Maastricht Salon Orchestra (MSO) in 1978. Initially, Rieu performed small classical crossover concerts with the MSO. In 1987 André renamed the MSO to the Johann Strauss Orchestra to emphasise waltz music. In Rieu's first concert with the orchestra, on January 1, 1988, there were 12 musicians.

At the time the orchestra first toured Europe, there emerged a renewed interest in waltz music. The revival began in the Netherlands and was ignited by their recording of the Second Waltz from Shostakovich's Suite for Variety Orchestra. As a result, Rieu became known as the modern "Waltz King," a title originally bestowed upon Johann Strauss II.

The orchestra has performed regularly with guest musicians and singers such as Carla Maffioletti, Mirusia Louwerse, Carmen Monarcha and the Platin Tenors.

== Members ==
By 2008, the orchestra, which variably includes instrumentalists, singers, and dancers, had expanded to 43 members, and in the 2010s the group variously included anywhere from 80 to 150 members, depending on venue and occasion. The most senior member of the orchestra is Jean Sassen, who has been a member since 1987. Male members wear tails, while female members, "dressed like Disney princesses" wear large pastel ball gowns designed by Rieu.
