= Carla Maffioletti =

Brazilian soprano

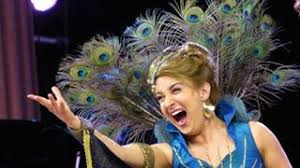
- Carla Maffioletti, July 2012
- Born: Porto Alegre, Rio Grande do Sul, Brazil
- Occupation: Soprano

Carla Maffioletti is a Brazilian soprano.

She was born in the second largest city in southern Brazil, Porto Alegre, a port town on Guaíba River. As a very young girl she began playing the violin before changing to classical guitar. Her talents were such that by her early teens she was performing at concerts throughout the country. While at university she began taking singing lessons and very quickly developed her outstanding voice.

Multilingual, Maffioletti decided to study voice at the Maastricht Academy of Music in Maastricht, the Netherlands, as did her friend Carmen Monarcha. While attending the academy, she came to the attention of André Rieu who hired her as a vocalist with his Johann Strauss Orchestra. In addition to global touring with the orchestra, Maffioletti has performed as a soloist on several of Rieu's albums and has appeared in his PBS television broadcasts in the United States. On Rieu's DVD I Lost My Heart in Heidelberg (2009) she sings "Die Juliska aus Budapest" and (with Mirusia Louwerse and the Berlin Comedian Harmonists) "Adieu, mein kleiner Gardeoffizier".
