= Larysa Moro-Borushenko =

Ukrainian pianist (born 1944)

Larysa Moro-Borushenko Лариса Моро-Борушенко
- Born: 18 June 1944 (age 82); Katowice, Poland
- Origin: Brazil
- Occupation: Pianist
- Instrument: Piano
- Years active: 1964–present

Larysa Pavlivna Moro-Borushenko (Ukrainian: Лариса Павлівна Моро-Борушенко, born 18 June 1944) is a Ukrainian pianist who currently resides in Brazil.

== Biography ==
Larysa Moro-Borushenko was born in Katowice, Poland on 18 June 1944 to her father, Pavlo, who resided in Barysh, Ternopil Oblast and is the sister of Oksana.

In 1966, she won a prize at the National Piano Competition in Bahia, Brazil.

In 1964, she graduated from both the Library Science Studio of the University of Parana and the Parana School of Music and Fine Arts, improving her skills in the United States and Austria. Since 1969, she has been an assistant professor of music at the conservatory in Velos Artes (Parana state). She has participated in competitions in São Paulo, Rio de Janeiro. She is the soloist of the Symphony Orchestra of the Federal University of Parana, Orchestra Antiqua de Curitiba.

She has given solo concerts in cities in Brazil, the United States, Canada, Germany and Ukraine. Larysa's musical style is characterized by a sonorous, emphatically convex presentation, bright accentuation, and an optimistic sound.
