= Robert Szreder =

Polish violinist (1946–2026)

Robert Szreder (1946 – 13 September 2026) was a Polish violinist who lived in the Netherlands. He was also a violin pedagogue at Maastricht Academy of Music, worked as a guest lecturer, and gave masterclasses around the world.

Szreder was born in Dęblin, Poland in 1946. He studied under professor Zenon Brzewski at the Fryderyk Chopin University of Music. Amongst other competitions, he won the Gaudeamus International Interpreters Award. Szreder was awarded the Polish Medal for Merit to Culture and the Officer’s Cross of the Order of Polonia Restituta. Szreder died on 13 September 2026.
