= Waltzing Matilda (album) =

Studio album by André Rieu and Mirusia
- Released: 28 April 2008 (Australia)
- Recorded: 2008
- Genre: Classical, pop
- Length: 79:11
- Label: Andre Rieu Productions

André Rieu and Mirusia chronology
The 100 Most Beautiful Melodies (2008)	Waltzing Matilda (2008)

Waltzing Matilda is a studio album by Dutch violinist André Rieu and Australian soprano Mirusia, released on 28 April 2008 in Australia. The album includes several Australian traditional songs sung by Mirusia. Rieu and Mirusia performed the tracks in their worldwide tour late in 2008. The album debuted at number two on the Australian ARIA Albums Chart. It reached number one in its second week on the chart in the lead up to Mother's Day, selling 17,560 units.

== Track listing ==
1. "Wiener Melange" — 6:35
2. "Scarborough Fair"^{1} — 3:40
3. "Waltzing Matilda" — 3:17
4. "Treasure Waltz" — 6:23
5. "La Vergine degli angeli"^{1} — 3:21
6. "Wine, Women And Song" — 6:16
7. "Botany Bay"^{1} — 4:03
8. "Du und du" — 6:15
9. "Thorn Birds: Theme" — 3:56
10. "I Still Call Australia Home"^{1} — 4:33
11. "Viennese Citizen" — 6:15
12. "Benedictus"^{1} — 3:50
13. "Charmaine" — 4:00
14. "Wishing You Were Somehow Here Again"^{1} — 3:53
15. "Fledermaus Quadrille" — 4:06
16. "Tie Me Kangaroo"^{1} — 2:25
17. "Home Among The Gumtrees"^{1} — 2:29
18. "Waltzing Matilda" (vocal version)^{1} — 3:54

^{1} features Mirusia

== Charts ==
Chart (2008)	Peak position
Australian ARIA Albums Chart	1
