= Bidu Sayão International Vocal Competition =

Singing competition held at the city of Belo Horizonte in Brazil

The Bidu Sayão International Vocal Competition (Portuguese: Concurso Internacional de Canto Bidu Sayão) is a classical singing competition held at the city of Belo Horizonte in Brazil named after that country's most famous opera singer, Bidu Sayão. It is a competition open to classically-trained singers of any nationality for up-and-coming contestants, all over the age of 18. The competition is divided between male and female participants and is the most important vocal competition in Latin America.

The competition has an international jury composed of conductors, artistic directors from international opera houses and musicologists. The competition was created in 1999 by the opera producer Cleber Papa who is its President.

== List of winners ==
| Name | Voice type | Country | Prize | Competition place and year |
|---|---|---|---|---|
| Eduardo Itaborahy | tenor | Brazil | 1st Prize | 2000, Belém do Pará |
| Daniel Lee | baritone | Korea | 2nd Prize | 2000, Belém do Pará |
| João Augusto O' de Almeida | tenor | Brazil | 3rd Prize | 2000, Belém do Pará |
| Gabriella Pace | soprano | Italy | 1st Prize | 2000, Belém do Pará |
| Marilda Costa | soprano | Brazil | 2nd Prize | 2000, Belém do Pará |
| Alpha de Oliveira | soprano | Brazil | 3rd Prize | 2000, Belém do Pará |
| Antonio Wilson | tenor | Brazil | Audience Jury | 2000, Belém do Pará |
| Orival Bento Gonçalves | bass | Brazil | 1st Prize | 2001, Belém do Pará |
| Manuel Alvares | baritone | Brazil | 2nd Prize | 2001, Belém do Pará |
| André Vidal | tenor | Brazil | 3rd Prize | 2001, Belém do Pará |
| Carmen Monarcha | soprano | Brazil | 1st Prize | 2001, Belém do Pará |
| Marília Vargas | soprano | Brazil | 2nd Prize | 2001, Belém do Pará |
| Lílian Souza Assumpção | soprano | Brazil | 3rd Prize | 2001, Belém do Pará |
| Rodolfo Giugliani | baritone | Brazil | 1st Prize | 2002, Belém do Pará |
| Miguel Geraldi | tenor | Brazil | 2nd Prize | 2002, Belém do Pará |
| Federico Sanguinetti | baritone | Uruguay | 4th Prize | 2002, Belém do Pará |
| Flávio Mathias | bass | Brazil | 5th prize | 2002, Belém do Pará |
| Denise de Freitas | mezzo-soprano | Brazil | 2nd Prize | 2002, Belém do Pará |
| Lys Nardoto | soprano | Brazil | 3rd Prize | 2002, Belém do Pará |
| Guiomar Milan | soprano | Brazil | 4th Prize | 2002, Belém do Pará |
| Ewandro Cruz Stenzowski | tenor | Brazil | Prêmio Estímulo | 2002, Belém do Pará |
| Luciano Botelho | tenor | Brazil | Prize "Estímulo" | 2002, Belém do Pará |
| Homero Velho | baritone | Brazil | Audience Prize | 2002, Belém do Pará |
| Guilherme Pires Rosa | baritone | Brazil | 1st Prize | 2003, Belém do Pará |
| Leonardo Pace | baritone | Brazil | 2nd Prize | 2003, Belém do Pará |
| Carlos Rodriguez | baritone | Brazil | 3rd Prize | 2003, Belém do Pará |
| Adriana Clis | mezzo-soprano | Brazil | 1st Prize | 2003, Belém do Pará |
| Helen Donaldson | soprano | Australia | 2nd Prize & Audience Prize | 2003, Belém do Pará |
| Rosana Marcela Schiavi | soprano | Argentina | 3rd Prize | 2003, Belém do Pará |
| Felipe Oliveira | baritone | Brazil | Prize "Revelação" | 2003, Belém do Pará |
| Leniza Menna Barreto | soprano | Brazil | Prize "Estímulo" | 2003, Belém do Pará |
| Madalena Aliverti | soprano | Brazil | Scholarship “Maria Helena Coelho Cardoso” | 2003, Belém do Pará |
| Bruno Ribeiro | tenor | Portugal | 1st Prize | 2004, Belém do Pará |
| David Marcondes | baritone | Brazil | 2nd Prize | 2004, Belém do Pará |
| Marcos Liesenberg | tenor | Brazil | 3rd Prize | 2004, Belém do Pará |
| Luciana Melamed | soprano | Brazil | 1st Prize | 2004, Belém do Pará |
| Sandra Medeiros | soprano | Portugal | 2nd Prize | 2004, Belém do Pará |
| Virgínia Cavalcanti | mezzo-soprano | Brazil | Audience Prize & Prize "Canção" | 2004, Belém do Pará |
| Alexander de Paula | baritone | Brazil | Prize "Estímulo" | 2004, Belém do Pará |
| Thiago Arancam | tenor | Brazil | Prize "Revelação" | 2004, Belém do Pará |
| Luciana Melamed | soprano | Brazil | Prize Orquestra Unisinos | 2004, Belém do Pará |
| Antônio Wilson | tenor | Brazil | Scholarship “Maria Helena Coelho Cardoso” | 2004, Belém do Pará |
| Marconi Araújo | countertenor | Brazil | 1st Prize & Prize "Revelação" | 2005, Belém do Pará |
| Geilson Santos | tenor | Brazil | 3rd Prize | 2005, Belém do Pará |
| Bárbara Llanes | soprano | Cuba | 2nd Prize | 2005, Belém do Pará |
| Cláudia Azevedo | soprano | Brazil | 3rd Prize | 2005, Belém do Pará |
| Giancarlo Barbieri | tenor | Brazil | Audience Prize | 2005, Belém do Pará |
| Manuela Freua | soprano | Brazil | Prize "Estímulo" & Prize "Canção" | 2005, Belém do Pará |
| Phoenix Luz | soprano | Brazil | Joungest Singer Prize | 2005, Belém do Pará |
| Diana Daniel | mezzo-soprano | Brazil | Special Prize of the Jury | 2005, Belém do Pará |
| Ji-Min Park | tenor | South Korea | 1st Prize | 2006, Belém do Pará |
| Leonardo Neiva | baritone | Brazil | 2nd Prize & Prize "Canção" | 2006, Belém do Pará |
| David Marcondes | baritone | Brazil | 3rd Prize & Audience Prize | 2006, Belém do Pará |
| Maria Luisa Freitas | mezzo-soprano | Portugal | 1st Prize | 2006, Belém do Pará |
| Vanessa Bertolini | soprano | Brazil | 2nd Prize | 2006, Belém do Pará |
| Maira Lautert | soprano | Brazil | 3rd Prize | 2006, Belém do Pará |
| Nadja Sousa | soprano | Brazil | Prize "Revelação" | 2006, Belém do Pará |
| Isabela Santos | soprano | Brazil | Joungest Singer Prize | 2006, Belém do Pará |
| Antonio Wilson | tenor | Brazil | Prize "Estímulo" | 2006, Belém do Pará |
| Yuri Jaruskevicius | baritone | Brazil | 2nd Prize | 2008, Belo Horizonte |
| Boris Azarian | bass-baritone | Brazil | 3rd Prize | 2008, Belo Horizonte |
| Ariadne Oliveira | mezzo-soprano | Brazil | 2nd Prize & Prize "Canção" | 2008, Belo Horizonte |
| Carla Domingues | coloratura soprano | Brazil | 3rd Prize | 2008, Belo Horizonte |
| Carlos Eduardo Vieira | baritone | Brazil | Male Audience Prize | 2008, Belo Horizonte |
| Carolina Rennó | mezzo-soprano | Brazil | Female Audience Prize | 2008, Belo Horizonte |
| Bianca Pignataro | soprano | Brazil | Prize "Estímulo" | 2008, Belo Horizonte |
| Cristiano Rocha | bass-baritone | Brazil | Best male opera singer | 2008, Belo Horizonte |
| Ludmilla Bauerfeldt | soprano | Brazil | Best female opera singer | 2008, Belo Horizonte |
