= Marc Clear =

German opera singer

Marc Robert Clear is a British opera singer, musical performer and director.

== Early life ==
Clear was born in Wegberg, Germany, to a Dutch mother, Maria Helena Peters, and Robert James Clear, a Senior Aircraftman (SAC) in the Royal Air Force; Clear's father was stationed in Germany at the time of Marc Clear's birth. After moving back and forth between the United Kingdom (UK) and Germany, the Clear family settled in the Netherlands, where Clear's father became a computer operator for a Dutch car firm. Clear's family moved once more during his youth and eventually settled in Sittard, in the Dutch province of Limburg.

Clear became interested in music as a teenager, and played the organ and guitar, occasionally singing. After completing his general education in Sittard, he managed to enter the Conservatory of Maastricht in 1983, where he initially studied to be a general music-teacher. He quickly lost interest and, after three years, reluctantly decided to major in classical voice, studying with known singers Hein Meens and Elisabth Ksoll. After the education, he entered the opera chorus of Aachen, Germany. After one year he switched to the WDR-Rundfunk-chorus in Cologne and, after a further six months to the Opera-studio for young soloists in Münich.

== Career ==
=== Opera ===
In 1990, Clear's first soloist position took him to the small city theatre, now known as the Theater und Orchester Heidelberg, of Heidelberg, Germany. In 1992, he moved to National Theater in Mannheim, and then two years later to the Badisches Staatstheater in Karlsruhe. He spent a brief year at the Gärtnerplatztheater in Münich and finally ended his opera career with a four-year engagement at the Deutsche Oper in Berlin.

During this period, Clear made a name for himself in the opera world. He was a frequent guest at opera theatres, concert venues and open-air festivals throughout Europe, such as: Hamburg, Dresden, Zürich, Montpellier, Vienna, Trieste and Mörbisch. Conductors included: Lorin Maazel, Marek Janowski, Christian Thielemann and Marcello Viotti. He was seen and heard in broadcasting, frequently working with the ARD, ZDF, ORF and DRS.

=== Popular Music and Musical ===
In addition to Clear’s participation in the world of classical music, he frequently sang in low-key rock-pop and cover bands such as "The Marc Clear Band" (Karlsruhe, 1997), "The Phil Collins tribute band" (Denmark, 2002) and "Barock", a progressive rock band (Denmark, 2003). After receiving critical acclaim in 1997 for his interpretation of "Tony" (West Side Story) at the Gärtnerplatz-theater in Münich, and also following a brief pause in his career in 2003, Clear decided to "cross over" into musicals with two engagements at the Ny Teater in Copenhagen, Denmark; Clear performed in the Phantom of the Opera and The Sound of Music. Career options in Denmark were limited and Clear decided to return to Germany for the purpose of furthering his musical career.

Clear entered a contract with Stage Entertainment and first received an engagement at the TdW in Berlin as a chorus and cover singer in "Les Miserables", before taking the role that would make him a household name in the musical-world. In 2005, Clear was offered the role of Athos in "Drei Musketiere", a musical first performed in the Netherlands and later adapted for the German stage. Clear's interpretation of the song "Engel aus kristall" became an instant success and readied him for a soloist career as a musical performer. Reprising the role of Athos from 2006 until January 2008 at the Apollo Theater in Stuttgart, he performed at the Musiktheater in Bremen as Cagliostro and Orleans in "Marie Antionette", at the Freilichtspiele Tecklenburg as Colloredo in the musical "Mozart!"(2009), Zoser in the Musical "Aida" and Peron in "Evita" (2010) and the MuKo Leipzig "Jekyll and Hyde"(2010/2011). Clear continued several engagements in the musical-genre and was a frequent guest in Tecklenburg, Leipzig, Schwerin, Bielefeld and Vienna.

=== Directing ===
So far, Clear has several direction credits to his name. In the summer of 2010, he was asked to direct and star (once again as Athos) in Drei Musketiere, which he adapted and directed for the Freilichtspiele Tecklenburg. The production received six awards including two for best director. In the summer of 2011, Marc Clear directed the musicals “Jesus Christ Superstar", Marie Antionette and “The count of Monte Christo” at the same venue. In 2018/2019 he also directed Robert Jason Brown’s “13” at the opera in Gera.

== Awards ==
- 1997: AZ Critics Award for Tony in "West Side Story".
- 2006: Da Capo Award for best Interpretation of Song.
- 2007: Da Capo Award for best Interpretation of Song.
- 2008: Da Capo Award for best Interpretation of Song.
- 2010: Magazine Musicals Award Best director " Drei Musketiere".
- 2010: Da Capo Award for Best director "Drei Musketiere".
- 2010: Da Capo Award for Best voice.

== Various roles (selection) ==
- Die Zauberflöte – as Tamino (Nationaltheater Mannheim, 1992)
- Der Bettelstudent – as Symon (Seefestspiele Mörbisch (1995)
- Cosi Fan Tutte – as Ferrando (Badisches Staatstheater Karlsruhe, 1996)
- West Side Story – as Tony (Gärtnerplatztheater, Münich, 1997)
- Die Zauberflöte – as Tamino (Opernhaus Zürich, Semperoper Dresden, Deutsche Oper Berlin, 1997)
- Eine Nacht in Venedig – as Herzog (Seefestspiele Mörbisch, 1999)
- Don Pasquale – as Ernesto (Aalto Theater, Essen, 2000)
- Die Entführung aus dem Serail – as Belmonte ( Montpellier, Antwerpen)
- Les Miserables – as Jean Valjean and Javert (Berlin, 2004 / Tecklenburg, 2006)
- Drei Musketiere – as Athos and Richelieu (Berlin/Stuttgart, 2005–2008)
- Aida – as Zoser (Tecklenburg, 2009)
- Drei Musketiere – as Director and Athos (Tecklenburg 2010)
- Jekyll and Hyde – as Jekyll and Hyde (Leipzig, 2010)
- Der Graf von Monte Christo (title role) Leipzig, 2011
- 2011-2013 Director Freilichtspiele Tecklenburg
- Jekyll and Hyde (title roles) Mecklenburgisches Staatstheater 2017-2019
- Chess (as Anatoly) Mecklenburgisches Staatstheater 2020/2021

== Media ==
- DVD Seefestspiele Mörbisch "Der Bettelstudent" (1995)
- DVD Seefestspiele Mörbisch "Der Vogelhändler" (1998)
- DVD Seefestspiele Mörbisch "Eine Nacht in Venedig (1999)
- CD Lukas Passion Bach/Orff/Jirasek with Classico Records Denmark(1999)
- CD Barock "Live and more..." (2003)
- CD Official Castrecording "Drei Musketiere" (2005)
- CD Musical Stars Volume 2 Sony/BMG (2008)

== Sources ==
1. Marc Clear
2. Freilichtspiele Tecklenburg
3. Barock
4. NOZ
5. MFJ
6. Seefestspiele Mörbisch
7. Oper Leipzig
8. Amazon "Drei Musketiere Castrecording, Berlin
9. Artinia Agency
