= Will Sanders =

Dutch horn player (born 1965)

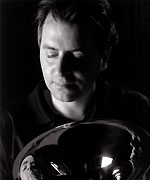
Will Sanders

Will Sanders (born 1965) is a Dutch classical horn player, conductor, and music school professor.

== Biography ==
Sanders was born in Venlo, the Netherlands.

He trained in music at the Maastricht Academy of Music, where he graduated with honours in 1988. In 1985, while still a student, he became a member of the European Youth Orchestra, conducted by Claudio Abbado. A year later he joined the Mannheim National Theatre Orchestra in Germany, serving as understudy horn soloist, and in 1988 he joined the Südwestfunk Baden Baden Radio Symphony Orchestra as horn soloist. In 1990 he joined Bavarian Radio Symphony Orchestra in the same capacity. He held the position of solo horn in the orchestra of the Bayreuth Festival from 1992 to 1997.

Sanders has worked with Vienna Philharmonic. In addition to his orchestral work, he has made CDs and other recordings for radio and television and is an international soloist as well as a member of chamber music ensembles, such as German Brass, Linos Ensemble, Mullova Ensemble and the Wind Art Ensemble. He has also worked as a conductor.

== Teaching career ==
Sanders has taught the horn at the Maastricht Academy of Music since 1995. He was named Horn Professor at the University of Music Karlsruhe in Germany in 2000. He has been an occasional guest professor of horn at the University of Rio de Janeiro in Brazil since 2002, and taught courses and master classes and directed international workshops in countries including the United States, Japan, Korea, Australia, Italy, Spain, the Netherlands and Switzerland. He has frequently been on juries for international competitions, including the Aeolus International Competition for Wind Instruments. Since 2012, he has been a visiting professor at the Academy of Music in Kraków in Poland.
