= Thiago Arancam =

Italian-Brazilian lirico spinto tenor

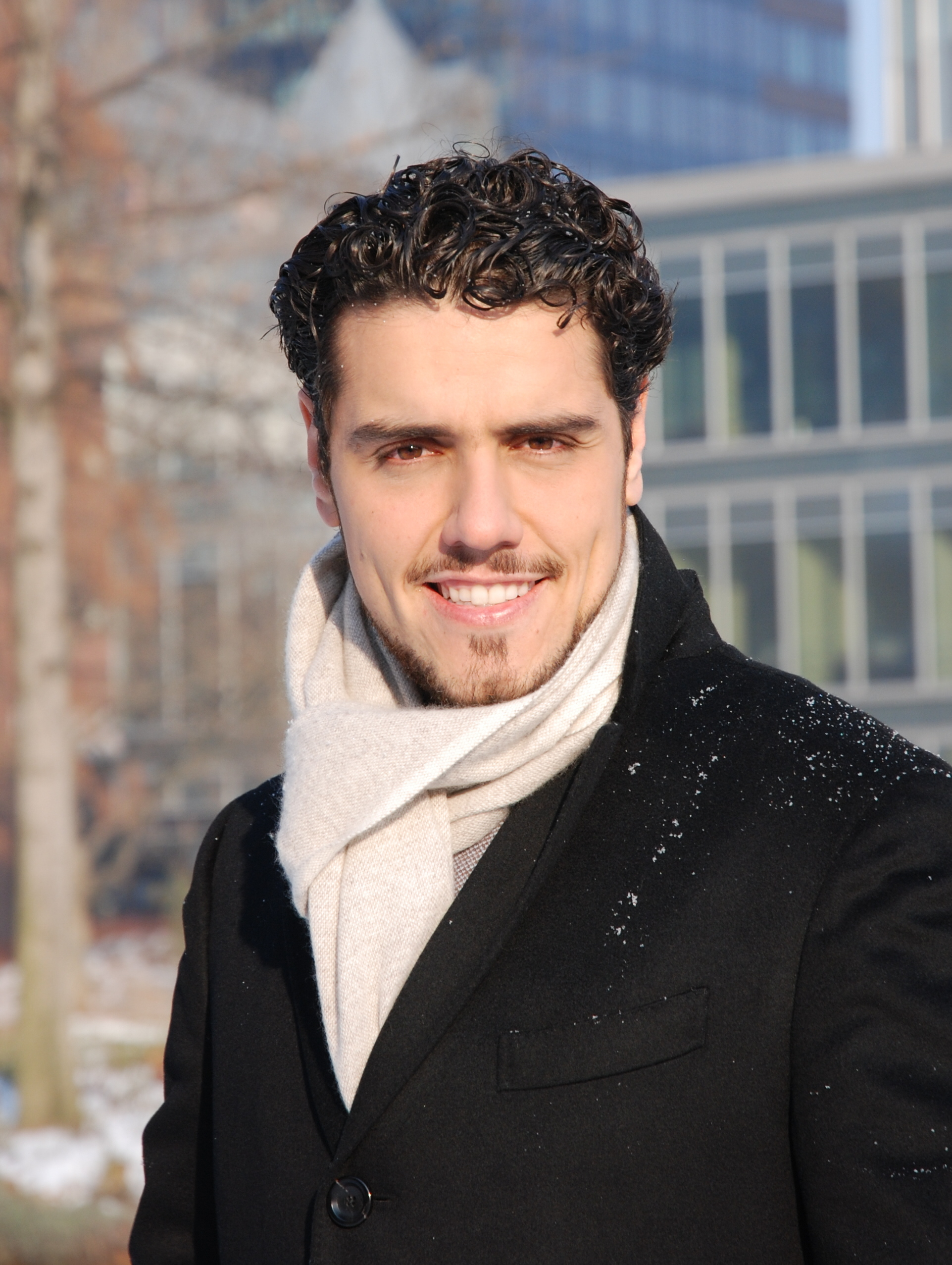
- Arancam in 2009

Background information
- Born: 6 February 1982 (age 44); São Paulo, Brazil
- Genres: Opera
- Years active: 2000–present
- Website: http://www.thiagoarancam.com/

Thiago Arancam (born 6 February 1982) is a Brazilian-Italian lirico spinto tenor. He graduated from the La Scala Academy in 2007. In 2008, he won three prizes at Operalia.

== Biography and career ==
Thiago Arancam was born on 6 February 1982 in São Paulo. He started his studies in São Paulo at the "Municipal School of Music" and continued at the Musical University "Carlos Gomes", where he graduated in "Erudite Chant" in 2003. He won the prestigious "Prêmio Revelação" (Revelation Prize) of the 5th Bidu Sayão International Vocal Competition in 2004.

Soon after, he was invited to attend the "Accademia delle Arti e dei Mestieri", associated with the La Scala in Milan, Italy. He is the first Brazilian to be taken into the Academy, directed by great soprano Leyla Gencer. It is there that he met his present voice teacher, Vincenzo Manno. He debuted in a lyric concert at La Scala on 27 February 2005.

In 2007, he participated in concerts with the Orchestra Sinfonica of the Friuli-Venezia Giulia, singing Zarzuela arias and classical Spanish songs. He received the critic award for the best emergent young voice 2007/2008 "Premio Alto Adige - Talento emergente della lirica 2007/2008" in Bolzano. In December 2007 he debuted in Puccini’s first opera, "Le Villi", in the role of Roberto at "Teatro Coccia" of Novara and at "Teatro Sociale" of Mantua.

In 2008, he performed in the United Arab Emirates, with the orchestra of La Scala and in two concerts with the Orchestra Camerata Brasil of Brasília, conducted by Maestro Silvio Barbato. He was chosen to participate to the famous lyric competition "Operalia 2008", where the jury awarded him three prizes: First Zarzuela Prize "Don Plácido Domingo", First Audience Prize and Second Opera Prize.

On 8 November 2008, Arancam debuted in the United States of America with the role of Don Josè in, Georges Bizet's Carmen, at Washington National Opera, with mezzo-soprano Denyce Graves, conducted by Julius Rudel.

In 2009 he played the roles of Cavaradossi in Tosca at Frankfurt Opera House, Maurizio in Adriana Lecouvreur at Teatro Regio in Turin, Radames in Aida in France, at the Sanxay Lyric Festival, and he sang a recital in London at St.John’s (Rosenblatt Recitals).

He also starred in a 2019 Brazilian production of The Phantom of the Opera.

== Discography ==
- Arias, 2004, TBA Records

== Awards ==
- "Prêmio Revelação" 5th Bidu Sayão International Vocal Competition 2004.
- "Premio Alto Adige – Talento Emergente della Lirica 2007/2008", by the lyric association "L'Obiettivo" of Bolzano, during the Operetta Festival "La musa leggera".
- "Operalia 2008" - First Zarzuela Prize "Don Plácido Domingo", First Audience Prize, and Second Opera Prize.
