= Theater Heilbronn =

Coordinates: 49°08′45″N 9°13′21″E

Theater Heilbronn is a theatre in Heilbronn, Baden-Württemberg, Germany.
