= Bidu Sayão =

Brazilian opera singer

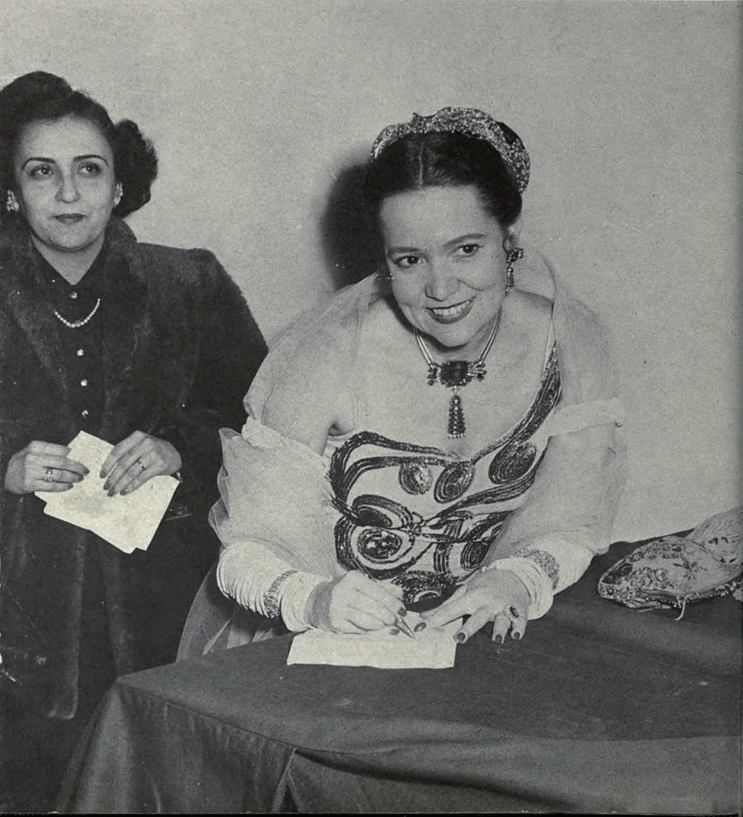
- Sayão during a visit to the University of Michigan (c. 1953)
- Born: Balduína de Oliveira Sayão; 11 May 1902; Itaguaí, Rio de Janeiro, Brazil
- Died: 12 March 1999 (aged 96); Rockport, Maine, U.S.
- Occupation: Operatic soprano
- Years active: 1920–1952
- Spouse: Giuseppe Danise

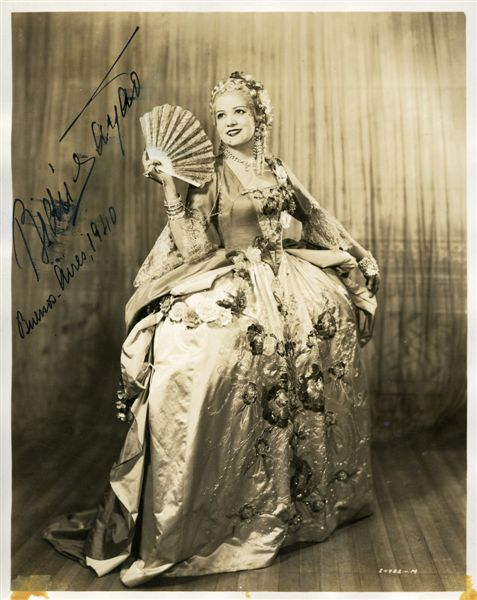
Bidu Sayão as Manon (Massenet), in the season of 1940 of the Teatro Colón in Buenos Aires

Balduína "Bidú" de Oliveira Sayão (11 May 1902 – 12 March 1999) was a Brazilian operatic soprano. One of Brazil's celebrated musicians, Sayão was a leading artist of the Metropolitan Opera in New York City from 1937 to 1952.

== Life and career ==
Bidu Sayão was born on 11 May 1902 to a family of Portuguese, French and Swiss heritage, in Itaguaí, Rio de Janeiro. Her father died when she was age 5, and her mother struggled to support her daughter's pursuit of a singing career. At age 18, Sayão made her major opera debut in Rio de Janeiro. Her performance led to an opportunity to study with the famous Elena Teodorini, first in Brazil, then in Romania; and then to study with Polish tenor Jean de Reszke in Nice. During the mid-1920s and early 1930s, she performed in Rome, Buenos Aires, and Paris as well as in her native Brazil. While at the Teatro Costanzi in Rome, she met impresario Walter Mocchi (1870–1955). After his wife, soprano Emma Carelli, died in 1928, the two became romantically involved and were married. However, it did not last, and in 1935, Sayão married Italian baritone Giuseppe Danise (1883–1963).

In 1930, she debuted at the Teatro alla Scala in Milan, and in the next year, she sang as Juliette in Gounod's Roméo et Juliette at the Paris Opera. In the same year, she gained a great success with her debut at the Opéra Comique as Lakmé. She soon became one of the leading lyric coloratura sopranos in Europe, especially in Italy and France. Her repertoire included Lucia di Lammermoor, Amina in La sonnambula, Elvira in I puritani, Zerbinetta in Ariadne auf Naxos and Cecilia in Il Guarany.

=== Metropolitan Opera ===
Bidu Sayão made her U.S. debut in a recital at Town Hall in New York City on 30 December 1935. Her U.S. operatic debut followed on 21 January 1936 when she and Danise sang in the penultimate production of the Washington National Opera, a semi-professional company not associated with its modern namesake; the performance of Léo Delibes's Lakmé was marred by a fractious dispute in which the orchestra musicians declined to play without payment in cash, and ultimately the performance was accompanied by a portable organ, with some singers appearing in costume and some in street clothes owing to a similar demand by the stage hands and costume man. She performed a few months later with the New York Philharmonic at Carnegie Hall singing La Damoiselle élue by Debussy. Her performance was under the baton of Arturo Toscanini, who became her greatest supporter and lifelong friend.

She sang her first performance at the Metropolitan Opera as Manon on 13 February 1937, replacing the Spanish soprano Lucrezia Bori. The critics, including Olin Downes of The New York Times, raved about her performance, and within a few weeks, she was given the lead in La traviata, followed soon thereafter by Mimì in La bohème. She also contributed to the Mozart revival at the Metropolitan Opera, becoming the pre-eminent Zerlina (Don Giovanni) and Susanna (The Marriage of Figaro) of her generation.

She performed to much acclaim for the University of Michigan May Festival in 1948 with conductor Thor Johnson. She sang "Un Bel Di" from Madame Butterfly as an encore.

Brazilian composer Heitor Villa-Lobos had an artistic partnership with the diva that lasted many years. She made recordings of a number of his compositions, including a famous one of Bachianas Brasileiras No. 5.

Bidu Sayão and her husband Giuseppe Danise purchased an oceanfront property in Lincolnville, Maine. After 15 years with the Metropolitan Opera, her last performance there was in 1952. For the next two years, she was a guest performer throughout the U.S, e.g., an appearance with the Florida Symphony Orchestra garnered national attention. In 1957, she retired completely from public performance; two years later she made her final recording, as the soprano soloist on Villa-Lobos's world premiere stereo recording of his cantata Forest of the Amazon with the composer conducting the Symphony of the Air.

Following her husband's death in 1963, Sayão lived quietly at her home - "Casa Bidu" - above a cove on the coast of Maine. She returned to visit Brazil a last time in 1995 for a tribute to her during the Carnival in Rio de Janeiro. She died on 12 March 1999, aged 96, at the Penobscot Bay Medical Center in Rockport, Maine. Her ashes were scattered across the bay in front of her home.

== Legacy ==
The United States government decorated Sayao in recognition of her singing for the troops during World War II. Following her last visit to her homeland, the government prepared plans to honor her memory. In 2000, the Bidu Sayão International Vocal Competition was established to promote Brazilian operatic talent through a world-class competition. Sayão's portrait by Curtis Ether hangs in the lobby of the Metropolitan Opera House in New York City.

== Bibliography ==
- The Last Prima Donnas, by Lanfranco Rasponi, Alfred A Knopf, Bidu Sayão, p. 507 (1982); ISBN 0-394-52153-6
