= University of the State of Paraná =

Public state university in Paraná, Brazil

Coordinates: 23°04′57″S 52°27′41″W

Paraná State University
- Universidade Estadual do Paraná
- Other name: UNESPAR
- Type: Public university
- Established: October 25, 2001; 25 years ago
- Rector: Salete Paulina Machado Sirino
- Students: Over 10,000
- Location: Paranavaí, Paraná, Brazil
- Campus: Apucarana; Campo Mourão; Curitiba I; Curitiba II; Paranaguá; Paranavaí; União da Vitória
- Website: www.unespar.edu.br

Paraná State University (Portuguese: Universidade Estadual do Paraná, Unespar) is a public state university in Paraná, Brazil. Its administrative headquarters are in Paranavaí, and it has campuses in Apucarana, Campo Mourão, Curitiba, Paranaguá, Paranavaí and União da Vitória.

The university is one of the public state universities maintained by the Government of Paraná and is affiliated with the state's Secretariat for Science, Technology and Higher Education. Its statute defines it as a special-regime state autarchy with legal personality under public law.

== History ==
Unespar was created by Paraná State Law No. 13,283 of 25 October 2001. Its institutional structure was later amended by State Law No. 13,385 of 21 December 2001, State Law No. 15,300 of 28 September 2006 and State Law No. 17,590 of 12 June 2013.

The university was formed through the integration of several state higher education institutions located in different regions of Paraná. State Law No. 17,590 of 2013 consolidated the institutions into a single autarchy named Universidade Estadual do Paraná and redistributed staff and administrative structures to the university.

Unespar was institutionally accredited by Paraná State Decree No. 9,538 of 5 December 2013, which also approved its statute. It was re-accredited by State Decree No. 2,374 of 14 August 2019 for the period from 6 December 2018 to 5 December 2026.

== Organisation ==
Unespar is headquartered in Paranavaí and operates through seven campuses: Apucarana, Campo Mourão, Curitiba I, Curitiba II, Paranaguá, Paranavaí and União da Vitória. The university also has an academically linked special unit at the Academia Policial Militar do Guatupê, in São José dos Pinhais, which includes the Escola Superior de Polícia Militar and the Escola Superior de Bombeiro Militar.

The rector of Unespar is Salete Paulina Machado Sirino. In 2026, she was identified by the university as rector and elected vice-president of the Associação Paranaense das Instituições de Ensino Superior Público for the 2026–2028 term.

The university administration includes pro-rectorates for undergraduate education, research and graduate studies, extension and culture, administration and finance, planning, people management, and student policies and human rights.

== Campuses ==
Unespar's campuses originated from state faculties and schools that preceded the creation of the unified university.

=== Apucarana ===
The Apucarana campus originated from the State Faculty of Economic Sciences of Apucarana (Portuguese: Faculdade Estadual de Ciências Econômicas de Apucarana, FECEA). It offers undergraduate programmes in areas such as applied social sciences, humanities and education.

=== Campo Mourão ===
The Campo Mourão campus originated from the Faculty of Sciences and Letters of Campo Mourão (Portuguese: Faculdade Estadual de Ciências e Letras de Campo Mourão, FECILCAM). It offers undergraduate and graduate programmes in areas including social sciences, humanities, education, history, geography and interdisciplinary studies.

=== Curitiba I ===
The Curitiba I campus corresponds to the School of Music and Fine Arts of Paraná (Portuguese: Escola de Música e Belas Artes do Paraná, EMBAP), founded in 1948. The campus is associated with higher education in music and visual arts.

=== Curitiba II ===
The Curitiba II campus corresponds to the former Faculty of Arts of Paraná (Portuguese: Faculdade de Artes do Paraná, FAP). It offers programmes in artistic fields including performing arts, cinema and audiovisual studies, dance, music, music therapy and visual arts.

=== Paranaguá ===
The Paranaguá campus originated from the State Faculty of Philosophy, Sciences and Letters of Paranaguá (Portuguese: Faculdade Estadual de Filosofia, Ciências e Letras de Paranaguá, FAFIPAR), founded in 1956. It is the only Unespar campus located on the coast of Paraná.

=== Paranavaí ===
The Paranavaí campus originated from the State Faculty of Education, Sciences and Letters of Paranavaí (Portuguese: Faculdade Estadual de Educação, Ciências e Letras de Paranavaí, FAFIPA). Paranavaí is also the seat of the university's central administration.

=== União da Vitória ===
The União da Vitória campus originated from the Faculty of Philosophy, Sciences and Letters of União da Vitória (Portuguese: Faculdade de Filosofia, Ciências e Letras de União da Vitória, FAFIUV). The campus serves the southern region of Paraná and neighbouring areas of Santa Catarina.

== Academics ==
Unespar offers undergraduate and graduate education in several areas of knowledge. In 2025, the university reported more than 80 undergraduate courses, 13 stricto sensu graduate programmes and 14 lato sensu postgraduate courses. A 2025 institutional data report listed 9,173 undergraduate students and 526 students in stricto sensu graduate programmes.

Admission to undergraduate courses occurs through institutional entrance examinations and other public admission systems, including the Sistema de Seleção Unificada (SiSU). Some arts programmes require a specific skills test (Portuguese: Teste de Habilidades Específicas, THE), particularly at the Curitiba I and Curitiba II campuses.

== Research and graduate studies ==
Research and graduate studies at Unespar are coordinated by the Pró-Reitoria de Pesquisa e Pós-Graduação. The university maintains stricto sensu graduate programmes authorised by CAPES, including academic, professional and network-based programmes.

Unespar certifies research groups in the Directory of Research Groups of the National Council for Scientific and Technological Development (CNPq). The university's research administration is responsible for institutional certification of research groups and for procedures related to research activity.

The university also maintains an online journal portal that provides access to the periodicals published by Unespar and is intended to support storage, visibility and digital preservation of university publications.

== Extension and culture ==
Extension and cultural activities are coordinated by the Pró-Reitoria de Extensão e Cultura. The pro-rectorate states that its role is to integrate the university with society through educational and cultural programmes, connecting university knowledge with popular, traditional and community knowledge.

Unespar carries out extension projects and programmes across its campuses. These include educational, cultural, social and community-oriented activities linked to teaching and research.

== Innovation ==
The university's technological innovation agency is AGITEC, the Agência de Inovação Tecnológica da Unespar. AGITEC was created by Resolution No. 009/2019 of the University Council and includes the university's technological innovation nucleus.

AGITEC also maintains a social incubator intended to support initiatives, ventures and social entrepreneurship projects connected to local and regional demands.

== International relations ==
Unespar's international activities are supported by its International Relations Office (Portuguese: Escritório de Relações Internacionais, ERI). The office supports cooperation with foreign public and private institutions and assists students, faculty and staff in academic exchange and international cooperation activities.

The university also has a Committee for Internationalization (Portuguese: Comitê de Internacionalização, COMINT), a permanent advisory body linked to the International Relations Office and composed of representatives from the seven campuses.

== Recognition and evaluation ==
Unespar is listed as active in the Brazilian Ministry of Education's e-MEC registry, the official national database of higher education institutions and courses in Brazil.

In 2022, Unespar received grade 4 in Brazil's General Course Index (Portuguese: Índice Geral de Cursos, IGC), an institutional indicator calculated by the National Institute for Educational Studies and Research Anísio Teixeira.

In the 2025 Ranking Universitário Folha, Unespar was listed in 171st position among Brazilian universities.

== See also ==
- List of state universities in Brazil
- Education in Brazil
- Paraná (state)
