= Carmen Monarcha =

Brazilian soprano (born 1979)

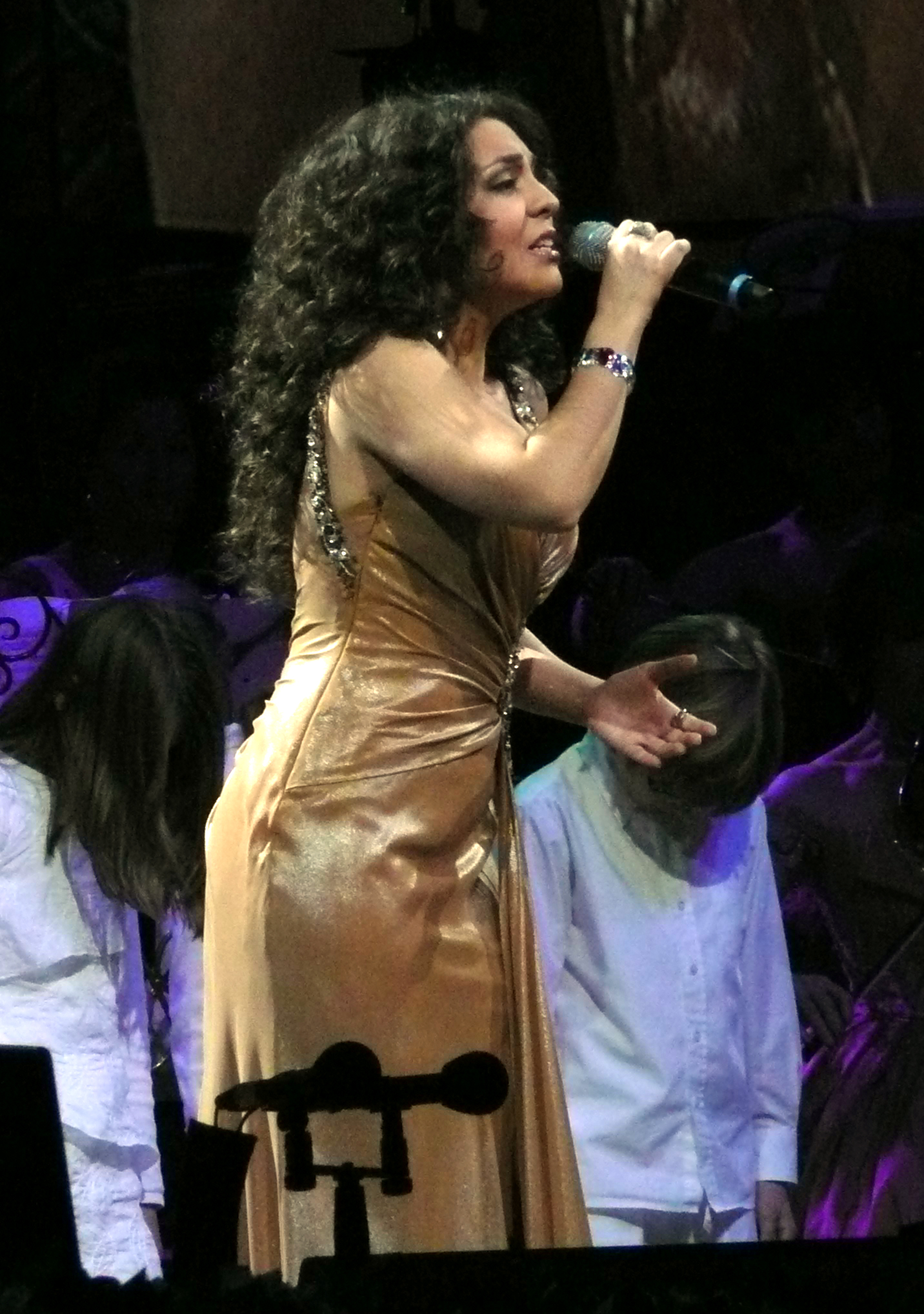
- Carmen Monarcha in concert
- Born: Carmen Monarcha; 27 August 1979 (age 46); Belém, Pará, Brazil
- Occupation: Soprano
- Children: 2
- Website: carmenmonarcha.com

Carmen Monarcha (born August 27, 1979 in Belém, Pará) is a Brazilian soprano.

Born into an artistic family in northern Brazil, her father is a writer and her mother, Marina Monarcha, a renowned Brazilian singer. She learned from a young age to play the cello and the piano and at first trained to be a concert cellist. However, she began to develop her singing voice and commenced taking lessons in Brazil. During the course of her career in music she became acquainted with fellow Brazilian singer Carla Maffioletti. After finishing her schooling, she and Maffioletti went to Maastricht, the Netherlands, for further vocal training. While there, Monarcha was hired as a vocalist by orchestra leader André Rieu to tour Europe and the United States with his Johann Strauss Orchestra.

She received critical acclaim as a winner at the Bidu Sayão Vocal Competition, a major international singing competition held annually in Brazil that is named in honor of that country's most famous opera singer, Bidu Sayão.

When her studies in the Netherlands were complete, Monarcha returned to her native Brazil but was lured back to Europe to perform as a soloist for Rieu's 2003 tour and has remained with the orchestra since. A soprano, she has sung on several of Rieu's albums and has appeared in his PBS television broadcasts in the United States, receiving particular praise for her interpretation of "O mio babbino caro" from Puccini's opera Gianni Schicchi. She has sung the "Habanera" from Carmen, also for PBS.
