= André Rieu =

Dutch violinist and conductor (born 1949)

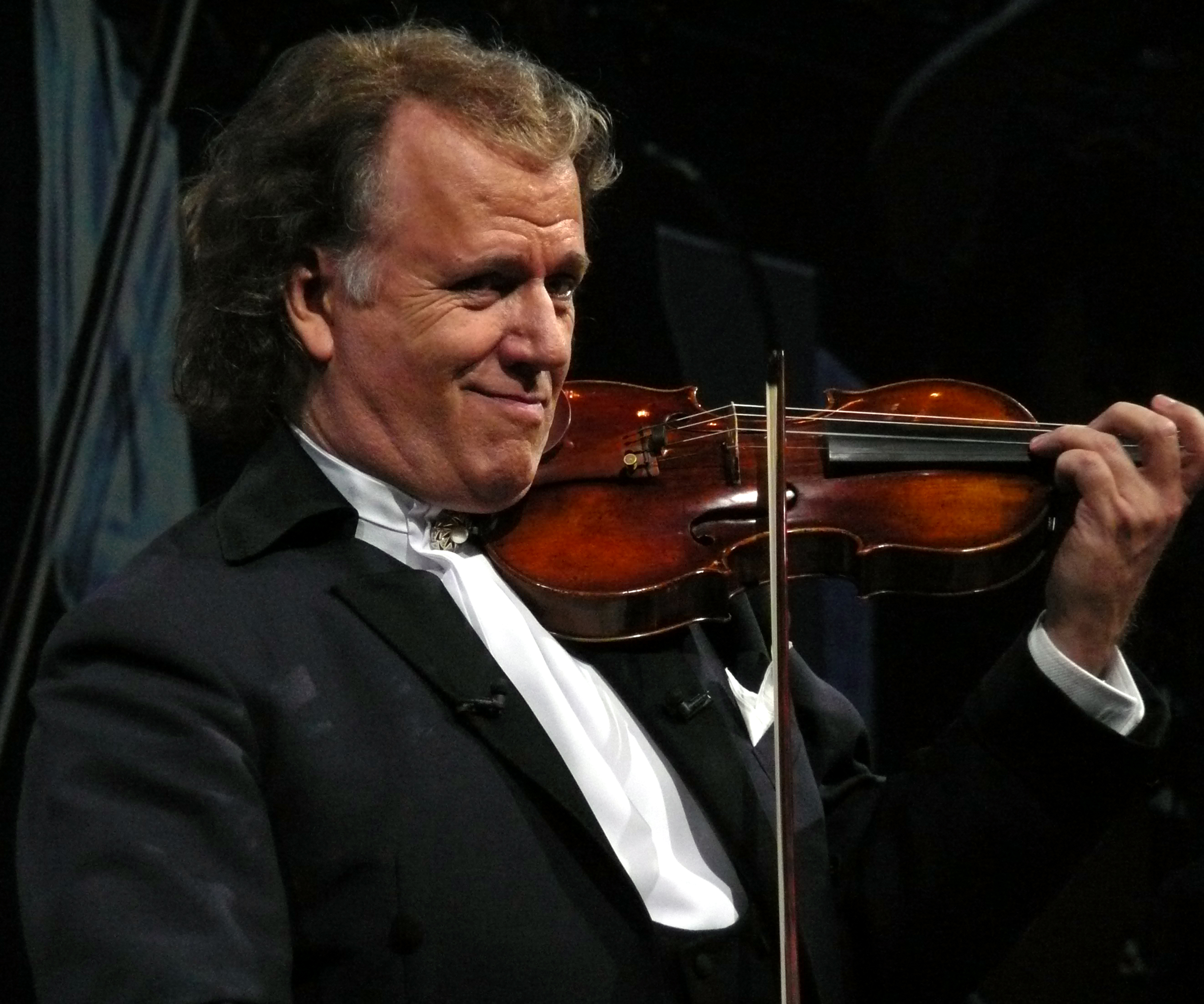
- Rieu in 2010

Background information
- Born: André Léon Marie Nicolas Rieu; 1 October 1949 (age 77); Maastricht, Netherlands
- Genres: Classical, classical crossover, waltz, easy listening
- Occupations: Violinist, conductor, entrepreneur, arranger
- Instruments: Violin, 1667 Stradivarius, Captain Saville
- Years active: 1978–present
- Labels: Denon, Philips
- Spouse: Marjorie Kochmann (m. 1975)
- Website: www.andrerieu.com

André Léon Marie Nicolas Rieu (Dutch: [ˈɑndreː riˈjøː], French: [ɑ̃dʁe ʁjø]; born 1 October 1949) is a Dutch violinist and conductor best known as the founder of the waltz-playing Johann Strauss Orchestra.

Rieu and his orchestra tour worldwide, often playing in stadiums. He resides in his native Maastricht, where he also regularly performs at the Vrijthof.

== Early life and education ==
The name Rieu is of French Huguenot origin, though both of Rieu's parents were Catholic. André was born to Andries Antonie Rieu and is the third of six children.

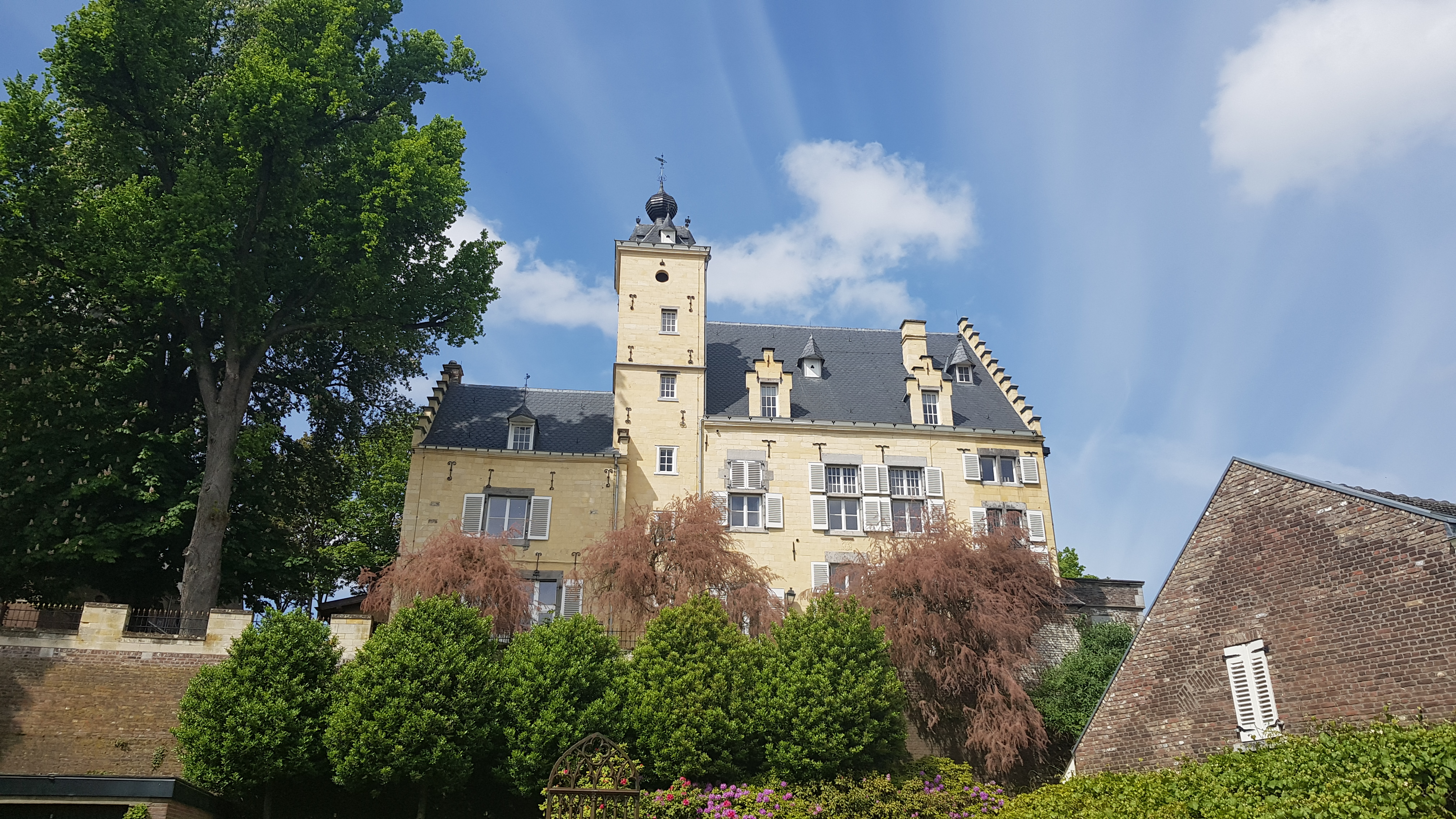
Rieu's residence, the Huis de Torentjes in Maastricht

Rieu's father was conductor of the Maastricht Symphony Orchestra. Showing early promise, André began studying violin at the age of five. From a very early age, he developed a fascination with orchestra, although he found his parents strict and moved away from his father's musical style in adulthood. He studied violin at the Conservatoire Royal in Liège and at the Conservatorium Maastricht, (1968–1973), studying under Jo Juda and Herman Krebbers.

From 1974 to 1977, he attended the Music Academy in Brussels, studying with André Gertler. He completed his training with the distinction "Premier Prix" from the Royal Conservatory of Brussels.

== Personal life ==
He married Marjorie Kochmann in 1975. She has been a language teacher and has written compositions. They have two sons, including Pierre, a producer who frequently works with the Johann Strauss Orchestra. He lives in a small castle in Maastricht, which he alleges was once inhabited by Charles de Batz Castlemore-d'Artagnan.

He speaks six languages: Dutch, English, German, French, Italian and Spanish. His net worth was estimated at €25 million in 2016.

== Career ==
=== Johann Strauss Orchestra ===
Vrijthof square during Rieu's annual concert series in his home town Maastricht (2018)

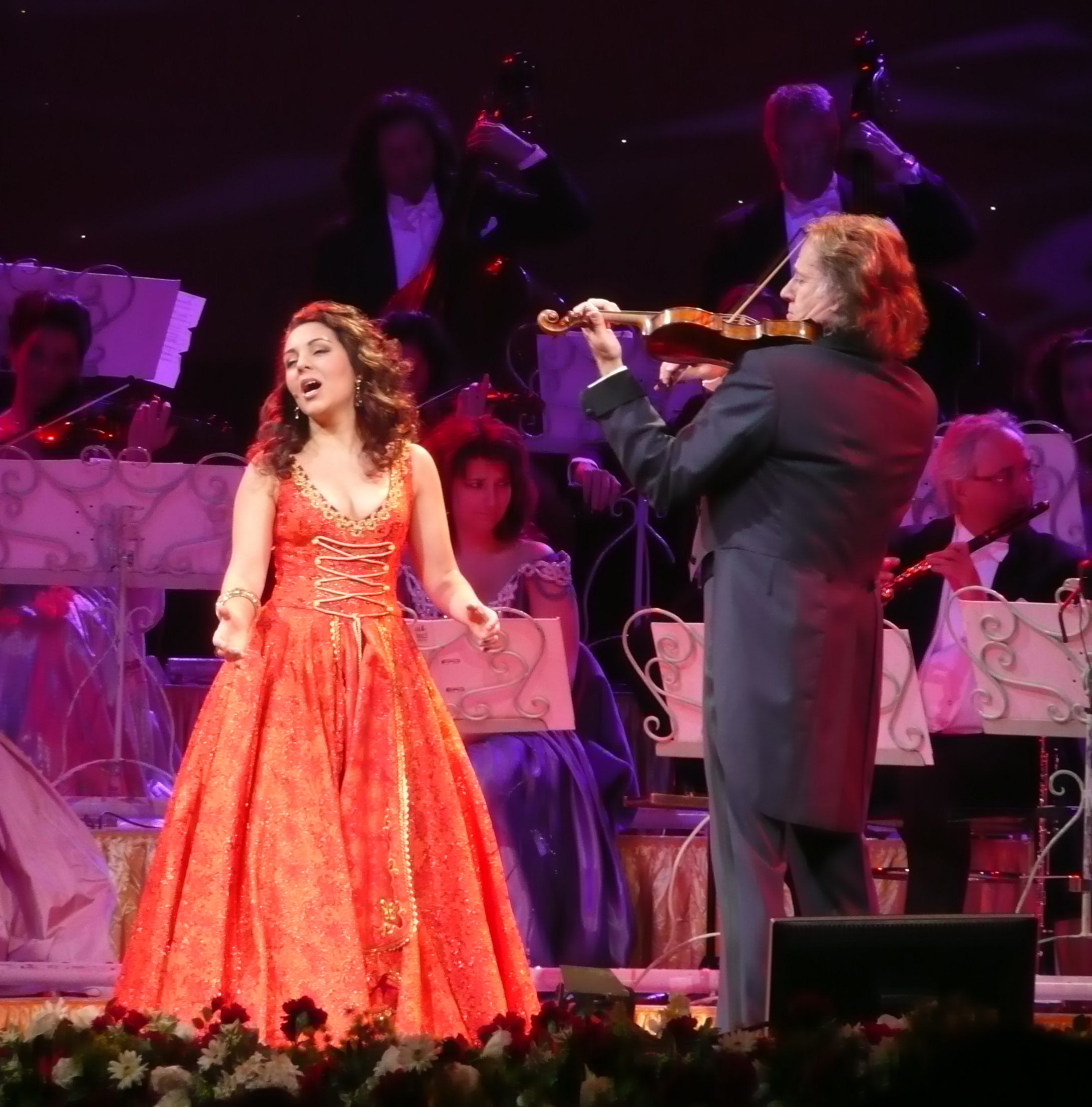
André Rieu and Carmen Monarcha (Düsseldorf, 2009)

Rieu created the Johann Strauss Orchestra in 1987 and began with 12 members, giving its first concert on 1 January 1988. As of 2020, he performs with between 50 and 60 musicians. Rieu plays a 1667 Stradivarius violin.

Rieu and his orchestra have appeared throughout Europe, North and South America, Japan, and Australia, and New Zealand. In 2008, Rieu's tour featured a full-size reproduction of Empress Sisi's Castle, the biggest stage to have gone on tour at that time.

Recent world tour results in Billboard / Pollstar annual worldwide top tours lists
Year	Rank	No. of shows	Revenue	Source
2010	#16	86 shows	$39,992,285	Billboard Top 25 Tours 2010
2011	# 9	102 shows	$67,104,756	Billboard Top 25 Tours 2011
2012	#10	99 shows	$46,785,710	Billboard Top 25 Tours 2012
2013	#20	70 shows	$49,881,605	Billboard Top 25 Tours 2013
2014	#17	70 shows	$42,983,266	Billboard Top 25 Tours 2014
2015	#20	101 shows	$51,151,367	Billboard Top 25 Tours 2015
2016	#23	71 shows	$40,169,471	Billboard Top 25 Tours 2016
2017	#42	89 shows	$47,700,000	Pollstar Top 100 Worldwide Tours
2018	#21	71 shows	$55,933,149	Billboard 2018 Top 25 Tours

For two weeks in 2013, one of the channels of the BSkyB group, Sky Arts 2 in the UK, was renamed as Sky Arts Rieu. Between 30 March and 14 April 2013 Sky Arts Rieu broadcast Rieu concerts and documentaries 24 hours per day.

Rieu also composed music for the 2014 film Tuscan Wedding.

== Reception ==
=== Australia ===
One of Rieu's largest fanbases is in Australia, where his popularity has drawn attention from some members of the classical music establishment. Chris Boyd, a critic writing for Melbourne's Herald Sun newspaper, did not criticize his playing, but described Rieu's main stage function as "blarney and delegation". Music researcher Sarah Keith described critical response to Rieu as “generally disdainful”, linking it to objections to his commercial approach and his treatment of classical music as popular entertainment. Keith argued that criticism of Rieu reflects fears about classical music’s “loss of presence and esteem”, but found “no discernible evidence” that classical music audiences were declining because people were attending Rieu’s concerts instead.

Eamon Kelly wrote in The Australian newspaper: "It is disappointing to see professional journalists indulging in cheap, inaccurate stereotypes to dismiss criticism of Rieu." He also wrote: "Equally misguided are those who cursorily dismiss Rieu. Rieu's live and recorded performances have brought joy to millions of people. Few in his audiences are regular classical music attendees and it could be seen as promising that, via Rieu, they are listening to standards of the classical canon. The fact that Rieu's focus is on highly accessible, enjoyable repertoire is not an argument against his musical credentials."

By December 2008, Rieu had achieved his 100th platinum accreditation in Australia and by May 2011, Rieu had sold over $50 million worth of wholesale shipments of his CDs and DVDs in Australia and was the highest-selling music artist in the Australian market between 2006 and 2011.

=== United Kingdom ===
Tom Service, reviewing a film of one of Rieu's Maastricht concerts (the highest-grossing concert film in British history upon the article's publication in 2015) in The Guardian, described the performance as the "very acme of commodified classical music", saying that Rieu turned "unsuspecting masterpieces" into "saccharine fodder". Also in The Guardian, in an interview with Rieu, Alfred Hickling stated that Rieu's critics were "missing the point", comparing Rieu's showmanship and business acumen to that of Johann Strauss II.

=== United States ===
Nina Siegal, for the New York Times, described Rieu as a "maestro for the masses, if not the critics", comparing him to Liberace while noting that his fame in the US had not reached the levels it has in Europe, Australia, and Brazil. In an email interview with Siegal, Rieu remarked that he saw frequent criticism of his act as "schmaltzy" as a compliment: "I’m trying to create a ‘Gesamtkunstwerk’ where music, décor and costumes all add up to a magical evening."

Regarding a 2017 concert in the Moda Center, Dean Paton for the Christian Science Monitor said that Rieu's performance felt "more like a pop concert than a classical recital" and a "two-hour running gag punctuated by this waltz or that aria." Paton compared the accessibility and popularity of Rieu's work to Arthur Fiedler of the Boston Pops and Leonard Bernstein of the New York Philharmonic.

== Honours ==
Country	Date	Appointment	Ribbon	Notes
Kingdom of the Netherlands	2002	Knight of the Order of the Netherlands Lion		
Province of Limburg, Kingdom of the Netherlands	2009	Honorary Medal of the Province of Limburg		
French Republic	2009	Knight of the Order of the Arts and the Letters		
City of Maastricht, Kingdom of the Netherlands	2010	Medal of Honor from the City of Maastricht		
Republic of Austria	2011	Grand Decoration of Honour in Gold of the Decoration of Honour for Services to the Republic of Austria		
Kingdom of Bahrain	2023	Member 1st Class of the Order of Bahrain		
Republic of Chile	2024	Pablo Neruda Order of Artistic and Cultural Merit		

== Selected discography ==
=== Albums ===
List of albums, with selected chart positions and certifications
Title	Album details	Peak chart positions						Sales	Certifications
Title	Album details	NLD	AUS	GER	NZ	SWI	UK	Sales	Certifications
Serenata (with Maastricht Salon Orchestra)	Released: 1984; Label: Philips (412 322–1)	-	-	-	-	-	-		
La Belle Epoque (with Maastricht Salon Orchestra)	Released: 1985; Label: Philips (824 717-1)	-	-	-	-	-	-		
Eine Kleine Salonmusik (with Maastricht Salon Orchestra)	Released: 1987; Label: Philips (830 971–1)	-	-	-	-	-	-		
Hieringe Biete (with Maastricht Salon Orchestra)	Released: 1989; Label: Marlstone Recordings BV (098904)	22	-	-	-	-	-		
Strauß Gala/ Strauss Gala (with Johann Strauss Orchestra)	Released: 1989; Label: Marlstone Recordings BV (098917)	9	-	-	-	-	-		
Preuvenemint / Vrijthofconcert (with Maastricht Salon Orchestra)	Released: 1991; Label: Mirasound (299079)	71	-	-	-	-	-		
D'n Blauwen Aovond (with Maastricht Salon Orchestra)	Released: 1992; Label: CNR Records (100.385-2)	16	-	-	-	-	-		
Merry Christmas	Released: 1992; Label: CNR Records (100.396-2)	34	-	-	-	-	-		NVPI: Gold
The Second Waltz	Released: 1994; Label:	-	-	-	-	-	-		NVPI: Gold
Strauß & Co / Strauss & Co (with Johann Strauss Orchestra)	Released: September 1994; Label: Mercury (522 933–2)	1	82	4	-	20	-	NL: 700,000	NVPI: 7× Platinum; BVMI: Platinum
Hieringe Biete 1 & 2 (with Maastricht Salon Orchestra)	Released: December 1994; Label:	7	-	-	-	-	-		
Vienesse Blend	Released: September 1995; Label:	-	-	-	-	-	-		NVPI: 2× Platinum
Straus Gala	Released: 1995; Label: )	-	-	-	-	-	-		NVPI: Gold
Het Beste Van André Rieu 'Live'	Released: May 1995; Label: CNR Music (2002305)	48	-	-	-	-	-		
Wiener Melange / The Vienna I Love (with Johann Strauss Orchestra)	Released: November 1995; Label: Mercury (528 786–2)	1	-	19	-	-	-		BVMI: Platinum
En Concert / In Concert	Released: October 1996; Label: Mercury (534 266–2)	5	-	-	-	-	-		BVMI: Platinum
Silent Nights	Released: 1997; Label:	-	-	-	-	-	-		NVPI: Gold
Stille Nacht / The Christmas I Love / Mein Weihnachtstraum	Released: November 1997; Label: Mercury (536 104–2)	18	-	6	-	-	-		NVPI: Gold; BVMI: Platinum
Romantique / Romantic Moments	Released: October 1998; Label: Polydor (557 914–2)	19	-	6	-	17	-		NVPI: Gold; BVMI: Platinum
100 Jahre Strauß / 100 Years of Strauss	Released: April 1999; Label: Polydor (547 456–2)	13	-	3	-	3	-		BVMI: Gold
Das Jahrtausendfest / Fiesta!	Released: November 1999; Label: Polydor (543 069–2)	9	-	3	-	8	-		NVPI: Gold; BVMI: Platinum
Celebration (with Johann Strauss Orchestra)	Released: April 2000	-	-	-	-	-	50		
La Vie est Belle	Released: October 2000; Label: Polydor (549 227–2)	15	-	6	17	12	-		NVPI: Gold; BVMI: Platinum
To Dream	Released: 2001; Label:	-	-	-	-	-	-		NVPI: Gold
The Collection	Released: June 2001; Label: Polydor (589 051–2)	-	-	-	-	-	-		BPI: Silver
Musik Zum Träumen / Dromen / Dreaming	Released: October 2001; Label: Polydor (589 306–2)	8	-	7	25	13	-		BVMI: Platinum
Walzertraum	Released: October 2002	-	-	8	-	35	-		BVMI: Platinum
Tour D'Amour / Love Around the World	Released: November 2002; Label: Polydor (065 260–2)	11	-	-	38	-	-		NVPI: Gold
Die Welt Der Violine - Ein Himmel Voller Geige	Released: 2003; Label: Universal Music (060249809938)	-	-	-	-	-	-		
Croisière Romantique / Romantic Paradise	Released: October 2003; Label: Philips (065 261–2)	10	-	6	-	24	-		BVMI: Gold
Live At Royal Albert Hall	Released: 2003 (US); Label: Denon (COZ 17192)	-	-	-	-	-	-		
Live in Dublin	Released: 2003 (US); Label: Denon (COZ 17293)	-	-	-	-	-	-		
At the Movies	Released: March 2004 (US); Label: Denon (COZ 17348)	-	-	-	-	-	-		
Tuscany	Released: September 2004 (US); Label: Denon (COZ 17431)	-	-	-	-	-	-		
Der Fliegende Holländer / The Flying Dutchman	Released: October 2004; Label: Polydor (9868113)	38	-	17	-	27	-		BVMI: Gold
Aus Meinem Herzen / Songs from My Heart (with The Johann Strauss Orchestra)	Released: September 2005; Label: Polydor (9834207)	33	-	26	-	56	-		NVPI: Gold
Weihnachten Rund um die Welt / Christmas Around the World	Released: December 2005; Label: Polydor/Universal Music (060249874707 0)	60	-	20	-	34	-		
Love Songs	Released: 2006 (US); Label: Denon (COZ 17600)	-	-	-	-	-	-		
The Homecoming	Released: 2006 (US); Label: Denon (COZ 17613)	-	-	-	-	-	-		
New York Memories	Released: October 2006; Label: Polydor/Universal Music (060249844387 3)	24	86	13	-	51	-		
The André Experience	Released: September 2007; Label: Philips (5318267)	-	-	-	-	-	-		
André Rieu in Wonderland // Im Wunderland	Released: November 2007; Label: Universal Music (060251749533 3)	29	72	14	-	62	-		NVPI: Gold
The 100 Most Beautiful Melodies	Released: March 2008 (Australia/ NZ); Label: Universal Music Australia (4800849); Note: 6×CD set	-	2	-	38	-	-		ARIA: Gold
Waltzing Matilda (with Mirusia Louwerse)	Released: April 2008 (Australia); Label: Universal Music Australia (5307654)	-	1	-	-	-	-		ARIA: Platinum
Top 100	Released: August 2008; Label: Note: 5×CD set	11	-	-	-	-	-		
At Schönbrunn, Vienna (with The Johann Strauss Orchestra and The Platin Tenors)	Released: November 2008; Label: Universal Music (06025 1705763 0)	-	76	-	-	-	-		
Live in Australia	Released: December 2008; Label: Universal Music (06025 1799206 1)	97	14	-	31	-	-		ARIA: Gold
Ich tanze mit dir in den Himmel hinein / Dancing Through the Skies / Passionnément	Released: February 2008; Label: Universal Music (06025 1787486 2)	99	-	-	-	-	-		
Live in Vienna (with The Johann Strauss Orchestra)	Released: 2008 (US); Label: Denon (COZ 174564)	-	-	-	-	-	-		
Masterpieces	Released: April 2009; Label: Philips (5318140)	-	9	-	-	-	-		
You'll Never Walk Alone (with The Johann Strauss Orchestra)	Released: May 2009; Label: Universal Music (06025 2706010 1)	80	2	-	4	-	-		ARIA: Gold
Best of André Rieu	Released: May 2009; Label: Sony (8869752243–2)	-	23	-	-	-	-		
Á Toi	Released: 2009; Label: Universal Music (272577–5)	-	-	-	-	-	-		
My Music My Life	Released: October 2009; Label: Universal Music (2718509)	-	83	-	35	-	-		
Live in Sydney 2009	Released: November 2009; Label: Universal Music (2726776)	-	51	-	-	-	-		
Forever Vienna	Released: December 2009 (UK and IRE); Label: Universal Music (0600753238790)	-	-	-	18	-	2		BPI: Platinum
Celebrates Christmas and New Year	Released: 2009; Label: Motif (MOTIF2007)	-	-	-	-	-	91		
Dreaming	Released: February 2010 (UK); Label: Decca (5893062)	-	-	-	-	-	94		BPI: Silver
The Magic Of André Rieu	Released: May 2010 (UK); Label: Motif (MOTIF008)	-	-	-	-	-	-		BPI: Silver
Live in Concert	Released: May 2010 (UK); Label: Motif (MOTIF009)	-	-	-	-	-	43		
Rosen Aus Dem Süden / You Raise Me Up	Released: May 2010; Label: Universal Music (0602527384924)	-	8	-	5	-	38		BPI: Silver
André Rieu presents Mirusia, Always & Forever (with Mirusia)	Released: October 2010; Label: Universal Music Australia (533 0693)	34	17	-	-	-	-		
Moonlight Serenade (with His Johann Strauss Orchestra))	Released: November 2010; Label: Universal Music Australia (533 0693)	100	17	-	38	-	4		BPI: Platinum
New Years Eve Concert	Released: 2011 (UK); Label: Motif (MOTIF017)	-	-	-	-	-	-		
Hits & Evergreens (with The Johann Strauss Orchestra)	Released: 2011; Label: Polydor / Universal Music (533 2282)	-	-	-	-	-	-		
And the Waltz Goes On	Released: October 2011; Label: Universal Music (0602527846101)	63	-	-	-	-	-		BPI: Gold; ABPD: Platinum
Waltzing in Europe	Released: April 2012; Label: Motif (MOTIF2005)	-	-	-	-	-	63		
December Lights / Joyeux Noël	Released: December 2012; Label: Universal Music (0602537123292)	24	-	-	-	-	53		BPI: Silver
In Love with Maastricht	Released: March 2013; Label: Decca (3728091)	-	-	-	-	-	53		
Rieu Royale (with The Johann Strauss Orchestra)	Released: March 2013; Label: Universal Music (0602537373208)	3	-	-	-	-	40		NVPI: Gold; BPI: Silver
Mother & Child - Lullabies The Whole World Loves	Released: April 2013; Label: Universal Music	-	16	-	-	-	-		
Classic Album Selections	Released: April 2013; Label: Universal Music (0600753386811); Note: 5× CD set	98	-	-	-	-	-		
Magic of the Movies	Released: October 2013; Label: Universal Music (060255707443 7)	-	50	-	-	-	-		BPI: Platinum
Celebrates ABBA / Music of the Night	Released: October 2013; Label: Polydor (3753681)	24	10	42	34	67	4		
Christmas Collection (with His Johann Strauss Orchestra)	Released: December 2013; Label: Polydor (3753681)	92	-	-	-	-	-		
Love Letters (with The Johann Strauss Orchestra)	Released: February 2014; Label: Polydor (0602537713868)	-	-	-	-	-	35		
Magic of the Musicals	Released: April 2014; Label: Universal Music (0602537839667)	34	17	-	-	-	42		
Love in Venice / Eine Nacht in Venedig	Released: November 2014; Label: Universal Music (0602537946327)	15	-	50	-	98	4		BPI: Gold
Best of Christmas (with The Johann Strauss Orchestra)	Released: December 2014; Label: Universal Music (4714049)	-	46	-	-	95	83		
Magic of the Violin (with The Johann Strauss Orchestra)	Released: May 2015; Label: Universal Music (060254725817)	-	-	-	28	-	36		
Roman Holiday (with The Johann Strauss Orchestra)	Released: November 2015; Label: Universal Music (0602547472403)	43	39	-	-	-	8		BPI: Gold
Magic of the Waltz	Released: April 2016; Label: Polydor (4783783)	-	34	-	35	-	16		
Viva Olympia (with The Johann Strauss Orchestra)	Released: August 2016; Label: Polydor (0602557074437)	-	-	-	-	-	42		
Falling in Love	Released: October 2016; Label: Polydor (5707923)	-	20	-	22	-	7		BPI: Gold
Amore	Released: November 2017; Label: Polydor (0602557900262)	72	-	-	20	82	7		BPI: Gold
Romantic Moments II (with The Johann Strauss Orchestra)	Released: November 2018; Label: Universal Music (8719326407906)	6	27	-	-	-	22		BPI: Silver
Happy Days (with The Johann Strauss Orchestra)	Released: November 2019; Label: Universal Music (7444754878899)	26	25	60	-	82	6		BPI: Silver
Jolly Holiday / Fröhliche Winterzeit (with The Johann Strauss Orchestra)	Released: November 2020; Label: Universal Music (7444754881820)	7	10	18	25	94	6		BPI: Silver
Happy Together (with The Johann Strauss Orchestra)	Released: November 2021; Label: Universal Music (744475488789)	28	28	63	-	71	5		BPI: Silver
Silver Bells (with The Johann Strauss Orchestra)	Released: November 2022; Label: Universal Music	48	78	-	-	-	4		
Jewels of Romance (with The Johann Strauss Orchestra)	Released: November 2023; Label: Universal Music	-	-	-	-	-	8		
Love Is All Around (with The Johann Strauss Orchestra)	Released: April 2024; Label: Universal Music	-	-	-	-	-	-		
The Sound of Heaven (with The Johann Strauss Orchestra)	Released: December 2024; Label: Universal Music	51	-	-	-	-	29		
Thank You Johann Strauss (with The Johann Strauss Orchestra)	Released: November 2025; Label: Universal Music	-	-	-	-	-	-		

=== Videos ===
List of videos, with selected certifications
Title	Details	Certifications
Strauß & Co / Strauss & Co / Strauss & Co (with Johann Strauss Orchestra)	Released: 1994; Label: Polygram Video (045850–3)	
Wiener Melange / The Vienna I Love (with Johann Strauss Orchestra)	Released: 1995; Label: Polygram Video (637986–3)	
In Concert (with Johann Strauss Orchestra)	Released: 1998; Label: Polygram Video (045412–3)	
Au Zénith de Paris (with Johann Strauss Orchestra)	Released: 1998; Label: Universal France (061 932–2)	
Romantic Moments (with Johann Strauss Orchestra)	Released: 2001; Label: Universal Music (635 690–2)	
La Vie est Belle	Released: 2001; Label: Mawa Film (MAWA 610)	ARIA: 3× Platinum
Live at the Royal Albert Hall	Released: 2002; Label: Mawa Film (MAWA 1203)	ARIA: 3× Platinum; BPI: Gold
Dreaming	Released: 2002 (US); Label: Denon (COZ 17152)	ARIA: 2× Platinum
Tour D'Amour / Love Around the World	Released: 2002; Label: Universal (065323–9)	ARIA: 2× Platinum
The Best of Live	Released: 2002; Label: Mawa Films	ARIA: 2× Platinum
Croisière Romantique / Romantic Paradise	Released: 2003; Label: Universal	ARIA: Platinum; BPI: Gold
Live in Dublin	Released: 2003; Label: Polydor (060249865997)	ARIA: 5× Platinum
Der Fliegende Holländer / The Flying Dutchman	Released: 2004; Label: Polydor (0602498681169)	ARIA: 5× Platinum
The Christmas I Love / Christmas with Andre Rieu	Released: 2004; Label: Denon (COZ 17349)	ARIA: Gold; BPI: Platinum
Songs From My Heart - Aus Meinem Herzen (Live in Maastricht)	Released: 2005; Label: Polydor (0602498758083)	NVPI: Gold; ARIA: 5× Platinum; BPI: Platinum
Christmas Around the World / Weihnachten Rund um die Welt	Released: 2005; Label: Polydor (0602498747063)	ARIA: 2× Platinum; BPI: Gold
New York Memories (Live at Radio City Music Hall)	Released: 2006; Label: Polydor (0602517135796)	ARIA: 8× Platinum; BPI: Platinum
In Wonderland	Released: 2007; Label: Polydor	NVPI: Gold; ARIA: 4× Platinum; BPI: Gold
Live in Vienna	Released: 2007; Label: André Rieu Studios (1758424)	ARIA: 3× Platinum; BPI: Platinum
New Year's Eve in Vienna	Released: 2007; Label: Polydor	ARIA: Platinum
Romance	Released: 2007; Label: Polydor (060251753896)	ARIA: 2× Platinum
On Holiday	Released: 2007; Label: Polydor	ARIA: 2× Platinum
On His Way to New York	Released: 2008; Label: Polydor	ARIA: Platinum
Love Songs	Released: 2008; Label: Universal Music DVD (176 8728)	ARIA: Platinum
Gala Concert	Released: 2008; Label: Universal Music DVD (176 8832)	ARIA: 2× Platinum
Live in Maastricht II	Released: 2008; Label: Universal Music DVD (1790573 3)	NVPI: Gold; ARIA: Platinum
Live in Australia	Released: 2008; Label: Universal Music DVD (1793514 3)	NVPI: Gold; ARIA: 21× Platinum
The 100 Greatest Moments	Released: 2008; Label: Universal Music DVD (1778144 3); Note: 3× DVD	ARIA: 2× Platinum
Ich tanze mit dir in den Himmel hinein / Dancing Through the Skies	Released: February 2009; Label: Universal Music DVD	ARIA: 2× Platinum
Champagne Melodies	Released: August 2009; Label: Universal Music DVD	ARIA: Platinum
At Schönbrunn, Vienna (with The Johann Strauss Orchestra and The Platin Tenors)	Released: 2009; Label: Universal Music DVD (060251705763 0)	ARIA: 10× Platinum; BPI: Platinum
Live in Maastricht 3	Released: September 2009; Label: Universal Music DVD (0602527171500)	ARIA: Gold
I Lost My Heart in Heidelberg	Released: 2009; Label: Universal Music DVD (060252727543 7)	ARIA: Gold
Forever Vienna	Released: 2009; Label: Universal Music DVD	ARIA: Gold
Live in Sydney	Released: November 2009; Label: Universal Music DVD (0602527392424)	ARIA: 5× Platinum
Gala: Live in de Arena	Released: 2010; Label: Universal Music DVD (0600753261057)	
My African Dreams	Released: August 2010; Label: Universal Music DVD (0602527484426)	ARIA: Platinum
A Midsummer Night's Dream (Live in Maastricht 4)	Released: October 2010; Label: Universal Music DVD (0602527508320)	ARIA: Platinum
Roses from the South - Live in Dublin	Released: November 2010; Label: Universal Music DVD (0602527543253)	ARIA: 2× Platinum; BPI: Platinum
Under the Stars (Live in Maastricht V) (with His Johan Strauss Orchestra & Choir)	Released: 2011; Label: Universal Music DVD (0602537007974)	ARIA: Platinum; BPI: Platinum
And the Waltz Goes On - Vienna, City of My Dreams (with His Johan Strauss Orchestra & Choir)	Released: 2011; Label: Universal Music DVD (06025278059000)	ARIA: 2× Platinum; BPI: Gold
Fiesta Mexicana!	Released: September 2011; Label: Universal Music DVD (00602527697888)	ARIA: Platinum; BPI: Platinum
From Maastricht With Love - The Collection (with His Johan Strauss Orchestra & Choir)	Released: 2012; Label: Universal Music DVD (0602537078899); Note: 6× DVD set	
Magic of the Movies (with His Johan Strauss Orchestra & Choir)	Released: 2012; Label: Universal Music DVD	ARIA: Platinum
Home for Christmas (with His Johan Strauss Orchestra & Choir)	Released: December 2012; Label: Universal Music DVD (0602537123339)	ARIA: 2× Platinum; BPI: Platinum
25 Jahre Johann Strauss Orchester / Happy Birthday! (with His Johan Strauss Orchestra & Choir)	Released: 2013; Label: Universal Music DVD (0602537280940)	ARIA: Gold; BPI: Platinum
Rieu Royale (Coronation Concert Live in Amsterdam) (with His Johan Strauss Orchestra & Choir)	Released: 2013; Label: Universal Music DVD (060253739997 0)	ARIA: Gold; BPI: Gold
Live in Brazil (with His Johan Strauss Orchestra & Choir)	Released: 2013; Label: Universal Music DVD (0602537343621)	ARIA: Gold; BPI: Gold
Christmas Around The World / The Christmas I Love (with His Johan Strauss Orchestra & Choir)	Released: 2013; Label: Universal Music DVD (3756999); Note: 2× DVD	
Magic of the Musicals (with His Johan Strauss Orchestra & Choir)	Released: May 2014; Label: Universal Music DVD (0602537839667)	BPI: Gold
Love in Venice: The 10th Anniversary Concert	Released: November 2014; Label: Universal Music DVD (0602537946365)	ARIA: Platinum
Magic of the Violin (with His Johan Strauss Orchestra & Choir)	Released: 2015; Label: Universal Music DVD (0602547258212)	ARIA: Gold
Wonderful World - Live in Maastricht (with His Johan Strauss Orchestra & Choir)	Released: 2015; Label: Universal Music DVD (0602547472250)	BPI: Gold
Magic of the Waltz (with His Johan Strauss Orchestra & Choir)	Released: 2016; Label: Universal Music DVD (0602547647805)	
Falling in Love in Maastricht (with His Johan Strauss Orchestra & Choir)	Released: 2016; Label: Universal Music DVD (0602557149098)	
Christmas in London (with His Johan Strauss Orchestra & Choir)	Released: 2016; Label: Universal Music DVD (0602557179613)	BPI: Gold
Christmas Down Under: Live from Sydney (with His Johan Strauss Orchestra & Choir)	Released: 2019 (US); Label: Decca (5487884)	
