= Mirusia Louwerse =

Australian soprano (born 1985)

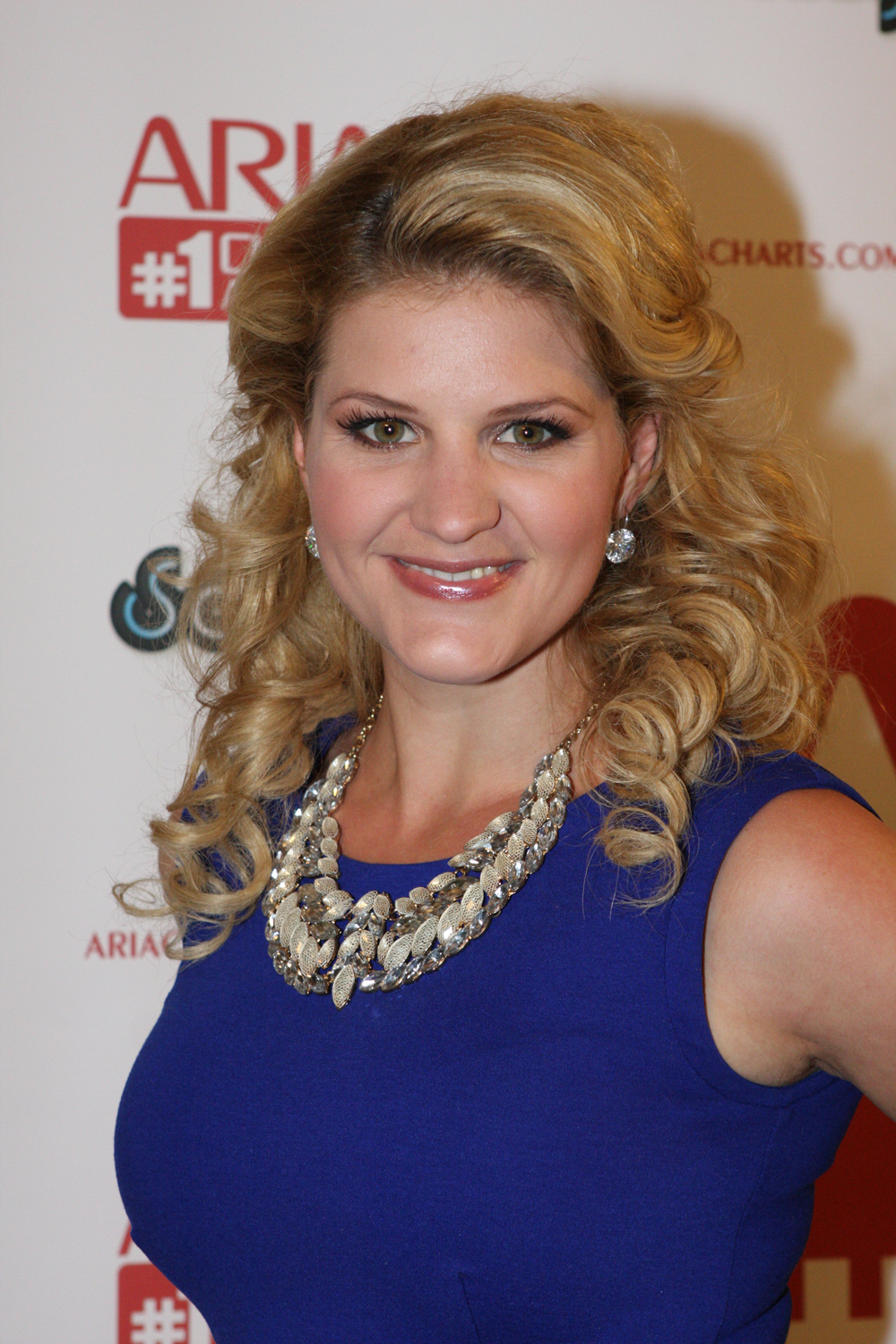
- Louwerse at the 2012 ARIA No. 1 Chart Awards

Background information
- Also known as: Mirusia
- Born: 29 March 1985 (age 41)
- Origin: Brisbane, Queensland, Australia
- Genres: Classical, classical crossover, operatic pop
- Occupation: Singer
- Instrument: Vocals
- Years active: 2006–present
- Label: Ambition Records/Timbre Records
- Spouse: Youri Wystyrk (m. 2015)
- Website: mirusia.net

Mirusia Louwerse (born 29 March 1985) is an Australian soprano. She performs as Mirusia and has been called "The Unconventional Pop Star" and "The Angel of Australia".

== Career ==
Louwerse was born in Brisbane, Australia, to Dutch parents and attended Ormiston College. She graduated in December 2006 from the Queensland Conservatorium in Brisbane obtaining a Bachelor of Music in Performance in Classical Voice. In 2006, Louwerse became the youngest ever winner of the Dame Joan Sutherland Opera Award and went on to record a debut EP entitled She Walks in Beauty.

Her aunt, who lives in the Netherlands, contacted André Rieu to tell him about her niece's talent. He listened to her voice on her website and phoned her straight away and two days later she was standing before him in his studio ready to sing. She has been touring with Rieu since 2007 as his star soprano. She is of Dutch descent and can speak Dutch fluently. In April 2008, Rieu and Louwerse released the album Waltzing Matilda. The album peaked at number 1 on the ARIA Charts, was certified platinum and became the 20th best selling album in Australia in 2008.

Her debut solo album Always & Forever was released in Australia on 8 October 2010 and debuted at number 17. It was released in the Netherlands in December 2010. Her DVD Always & Forever was released in March 2011 and stayed at the No. 1 position on the ARIA DVD charts for four weeks. In 2012 Louwerse won the ARIA No. 1 Chart Award for Always & Forever and was the only classical artist to receive such an award.

In 2013, Louwerse performed with Rieu at the coronation concert of the King of the Netherlands, Willem-Alexander. In this same year, to celebrate Benjamin Britten's 100th birthday, she performed under the baton of John Curro with the Queensland Youth Symphony Britten's War Requiem in the Queensland Performing Arts Centre. 2013 also saw Louwerse embark on her first full scale national tour of the Netherlands on her "My Second Home Tour", which was also filmed for DVD and released as Beautiful That Way on DVD and CD. In 2014, Louwerse toured with her solo tour "My Favorite Things" to sold-out audiences across the Netherlands and Australia.

She released This Time Tomorrow in May 2016. The CD is a studio recording and the DVD was filmed live in the Netherlands. Both the CD and DVD charted in the Top 10 on the Dutch and Australian charts, with the CD's highest position at No. 1 on the ARIA Classical Crossover charts and the DVD at No. 4 on the ARIA Music DVD chart.

Mirusia toured internationally in 2016 and the beginning of 2017 with her concert tour "This Time Tomorrow" with 40 concerts. In 2017, Mirusia toured internationally with her concert tour "From the Heart" which began in the Netherlands in March 2017 and saw her perform over 40 concerts worldwide. In 2018 Mirusia performed a special concert tour in the Netherlands entitled "An Enchanted Evening" to full houses and exceptional reviews.

Mirusia debuted in professional musical theatre in April 2019 as the lead role in the new musical Mimma – A musical of War and Friendship.

At the start of 2019, Mirusia released the album A Salute to The Seekers. The album debuted at No. 1 on the ARIA Charts and was in the Top 20 on the Jazz and Blues charts for three consecutive months. Together with the original Seekers (Athol Guy, Keith Potger, Bruce Woodley) Mirusia performed sold-out shows at Brisbane's QPAC Concert Hall, Sydney Recital Hall and Melbourne Recital Centre late 2019. At these concerts the Original Seekers officially welcomed Mirusia to "The Seekers Family" and Mirusia gave tribute to The Seekers and her great inspiration, Judith Durham.

2019 saw Mirusia embark on a 40 date concert tour around Australia with her new concert program "A Salute to The Seekers and the Classics".

This tour ran until 12 May 2022 due to Covid19 postponements and lockdowns in Australia. In 2021 Mirusia also released a new Music DVD Live in Concert and live album of the same name. Both DVD and Album went to the #1 positions on the ARIA Charts with the DVD placing at #15 on the Annual Charts and the Album at #22 on the Annual Charts. The Album Live in Concert has been nominated as "Best Classical Album" at the 2022 AIR Awards.

Mirusia's album, Songbird, which was released in February 2022, debuted at the #1 position on the ARIA Classical Crossover Charts, #9 on the ARIA Australian Artist Charts & #1 on the AIR Independent Album Charts. Mirusia's production company 'Mirusia Productions' won the Redland Business Excellence Award in Creative Industries in October 2022 and in November 2022 Mirusia won the Hollywood Music in Media Award for Best Holiday Song with "Snowflake".

2024, saw Mirusia release a Core Classical album called Classique. This album debuted at the #1 position on the Classical and Classical-Crossover Charts in Australia. She also won her second Hollywood Music in Media Award for Best Special Project with "Braveship Symphonic Suite" in which she features as soloist in the song "Fly With Me" written by Matt Cook.

During 2025, Mirusia toured her "Celebration" Tour around Australia. This tour featured many fan favourites and new material. Mirusia was also nominated as a Queensland Australian of the Year. 2026 sees Mirusia appearing in concerts throughout Australia and concluding her year with "Christmas Down Under", an uplifting Christmas Concert Tour throughout The Netherlands.

== Charity ==
Louwerse is an ambassador for the Australian Children's Music Foundation and believes strongly that if children are exposed to music or are involved in music, they will grow up to be better human beings. Since 2010, Louwerse has participated in concerts to raise funds for the ACMF. She raised more than $260,000 in 2013, for the ACMF, Redland Foundation and Mater Children's Hospital, and was recognised with a 'QLD Volunteer of the Year' Award. Louwerse is also the ambassador for the Redland Foundation, showing her support for her community in Redland City where she grew up and still lives today.

In 2021, Mirusia became the Prima Ambassador for Silver Memories, a program backed by research and clinical studies to help elderly Australians feel socially-engaged and connected through nostalgic music. In 2024, Mirusia was announced as Redland's Coast Citizen of the Year at the Australia Day Awards for her extensive volunteer work and contributions to music. Mirusia was nominated in 2025 as Queensland Australian of the Year for her outstanding contribution to her community and beyond through her philanthropic and volunteering efforts.

== Personal life ==
In July 2015, Louwerse married her long term boyfriend Youri Wystyrk. The wedding was a much celebrated affair with André Rieu writing a special piece of music and recording a video clip of the pair before their wedding. In December 2017, Louwerse gave birth to the couple's first child, Sascha.

== Discography ==
=== Studio albums ===
Title	Album details	Peak chart positions				Certifications
Title	Album details	AUS	GER	NLD	NZ	Certifications
Waltzing Matilda (with André Rieu)	Released: April 2008; Label: Universal Music Australia (5307654); Formats: CD, digital	1	—	—	3	ARIA: Platinum
Ich tanze mit dir in den Himmel hinein (with André Rieu)	Released: October 2008; Label: Universal Music Germany (0602517874862); Formats: CD, digital	—	50	—	—	
Always and Forever	Released: October 2010; Label: Universal Music Australia (5330693); Formats: CD, digital	17	—	34	—	ARIA: Platinum (DVD)
Home	Released: July 2012; Label: Mirusia Productions; Formats: digital	—	—	—	—	
My Favourite Things	Released: November 2014; Label: Mirusia Productions; Formats: CD, digital	—	—	17	—	
This Time Tomorrow	Released: April 2016; Label: Fanfare (FANFARE233); Formats: CD, digital	21	—	—	—	
From the Heart	Released: February 2017 (Europe); Label: Timbre (8718456049161); Formats: CD, digital	—	—	32	—	
A Salute to The Seekers	Released: 25 January 2019; Label: Fanfare (FANFARE305); Formats: CD, digital	27	—	—	—	
Christmas Memories	Released: October 2019; Label: Fanfare (FANFARE333); Formats: CD, digital	—	—	—	—	
Songbird	Released: February 2022; Label: Ambition (AMBITION143); Formats: CD, digital; Producer: Michael Cristiano	80	—	—	—	
Duets	Released: 20 January 2023; Label: Ambition (AMBITION207); Formats: CD, digital; Producer: Michael Cristiano	—	—	—	—	
Classique	Released: 23 February 2024; Label: Ambition (AMBITION222); Formats: CD, digital; Producer: Michael Cristiano	—	—	—	—	

=== Live albums ===
Title	Album details	Peak chart positions	
Title	Album details	AUS	NLD
Beautiful That Way: Live in Holland	Released: January 2013; Label: Timbre Records (2013MIR01) & Universal Australia; Formats: CD+DVD, digital	—	96
Live in Concert	Released: 4 June 2021; Label: Sony Music; Formats: CD+DVD, digital	57	—

=== Extended plays ===
Title	EP details
She Walks in Beauty	Released: 2006

== Awards and nominations ==
=== AIR Awards ===
The Australian Independent Record Awards (commonly known informally as AIR Awards) is an annual awards night to recognise, promote and celebrate the success of Australia's Independent Music sector.

Year	Nominee / work	Award	Result	Ref.
2022	Live in Concert	Best Independent Classical Album or EP	Nominated	
2023	Songbird	Best Independent Classical Album or EP	Nominated	

=== Hollywood Music in Media Awards ===
The Hollywood Music in Media Awards (HMMA) is an award organisation honouring original music (song and score) in all forms of visual media including film, TV, video games, trailers, commercial advertisements, documentaries, music videos and special programs.

Year	Nominee / work	Award	Result	Ref.
2022	"Snowflake"	Best Song – Music Genre: Holiday	Won	
2024	"Fly With Me"	Braveship Symphonic Suite by Matt Cook – Music Genre: Best Special Project	Won	
