= Kings of Leon discography =

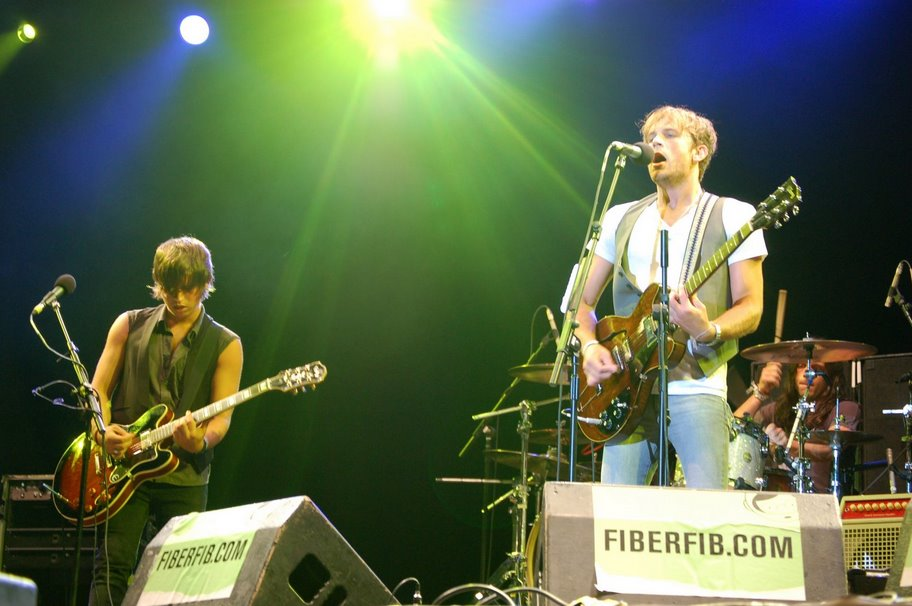
- Kings of Leon performing live at Festival Internacional de Benicàssim in July 2007
- Studio albums: 10
- Extended plays: 5
- Live albums: 1
- Compilation albums: 2
- Singles: 26
- Video albums: 2
- Music videos: 27
- Promotional singles: 3

The discography of American rock band Kings of Leon consists of ten studio albums, one live album, two compilation albums, two video album, five extended plays, 26 singles, one promotional single and 26 music videos. As of 2016, the band has sold over 21 million albums worldwide and 38 million singles. The band released their debut extended play Holy Roller Novocaine in February 2003, followed by the release of the extended play What I Saw in May. Their debut studio album, Youth and Young Manhood, was released in July 2003, peaking at number 113 on the US Billboard 200 and number three on the UK Albums Chart. The album has since been certified two times platinum by the British Phonographic Industry (BPI) and three times platinum by the Australian Recording Industry Association (ARIA). Three singles were released from the album, including the UK top 40 hit "Molly's Chambers". In November 2004, Kings of Leon released their second album, Aha Shake Heartbreak. The album peaked at number 55 on the Billboard 200 and number three on the UK Albums Chart. It has been certified double platinum by the BPI and the ARIA. The album's first single, "The Bucket", peaked at number 16 in the UK; it also became the band's first single to chart in the United States, where it peaked at number 23 on the US Billboard Alternative Songs chart.

In March 2007, the band's third album Because of the Times was released, peaking at number 25 on the Billboard 200 and topping the Irish, New Zealand and the UK albums charts. Two of the album's singles, "On Call" and "Fans", became top 20 hits in the UK. Because of the Times has since been certified two times platinum by the ARIA and by the BPI and three times platinum by the Irish Recorded Music Association (IRMA). The band saw their biggest commercial success with the release of their fourth studio album, Only by the Night, in September 2008. The album spawned the hit singles "Sex on Fire" and "Use Somebody", which peaked at numbers 56 and 4 respectively on the US Billboard Hot 100 and became top ten hits in multiple other countries. Only by the Night peaked at number four on the Billboard 200, while topping the charts in the charts of multiple countries, including Australia, Ireland, New Zealand and the UK. It received multiple multi-platinum certifications; the album was certified double platinum by the RIAA, eleven times platinum by the ARIA and nine times platinum by the BPI. Only by the Night went on to become the twenty-first best selling album worldwide in 2008, according to the International Federation of the Phonographic Industry.

Come Around Sundown, the band's fifth studio album, was released in October 2010. The album peaked at number two on the Billboard 200 and topped the charts in countries such as Australia, Canada, New Zealand and the UK. The album has since been certified Gold by the RIAA and two times platinum by the ARIA. "Radioactive", the first single from Come Around Sundown, peaked at number 37 on the Billboard Hot 100 and topped the Alternative Songs chart.

== Albums ==
=== Studio albums ===
List of studio albums, with selected chart positions, sales figures and certifications
Title	Album details	Peak chart positions										Sales	Certifications
Title	Album details	US	AUS	AUT	BEL	CAN	GER	IRL	NLD	NZ	UK	Sales	Certifications
Youth & Young Manhood	Released: August 19, 2003 (US); Label: RCA; Formats: CD, LP, digital download	113	46	—	—	—	52	18	— (Note: Youth & Young Manhood did not enter the Dutch Album Top 100, but entered the Dutch Midprice Top 50 chart at number two.)	43	3	US: 218,000; UK: 500,000	ARIA: 3× Platinum; BPI: 2× Platinum
Aha Shake Heartbreak	Released: February 22, 2005 (US); Label: RCA; Formats: CD, LP, digital download	55	25	—	87	99	39	3	79	29	3	US: 262,000	ARIA: 2× Platinum; BPI: 2× Platinum; IRMA: 2× Platinum
Because of the Times	Released: April 3, 2007 (US); Label: RCA; Formats: CD, LP, digital download	25	4	35	20	31	32	1	62	1	1	US: 226,000	ARIA: 2× Platinum; BPI: 3× Platinum; BRMA: Gold; BVMI: Gold; IRMA: 3× Platinum; RMNZ: 2× Platinum
Only by the Night	Released: September 23, 2008 (US); Label: RCA; Formats: CD, LP, digital download	4	1	6	1	2	16	1	3	1	1	US: 2,500,000; AUS: 690,000; UK: 3,278,264	RIAA: 2× Platinum; ARIA: 11× Platinum; BPI: 10× Platinum; BRMA: 2× Platinum; BVMI: 7× Gold; IFPI AUT: 2× Platinum; IRMA: 5× Platinum; MC: 4× Platinum; NVPI: Platinum; RMNZ: 10× Platinum
Come Around Sundown	Released: October 19, 2010 (US); Label: RCA; Formats: CD, LP, digital download	2	1	1	1	1	1	1	2	1	1	US: 776,000; UK: 915,329	RIAA: Gold; ARIA: 2× Platinum; BPI: 3× Platinum; BRMA: Gold; BVMI: Platinum; IFPI AUT: Platinum; IRMA: 3× Platinum; MC: Platinum; NVPI: Gold; RMNZ: 3× Platinum
Mechanical Bull	Released: September 24, 2013 (US); Label: RCA; Formats: CD, LP, digital download	2	1	2	4	2	2	1	2	1	1	US: 347,000; UK: 323,240	ARIA: Gold; BPI: Platinum; BVMI: Gold; IFPI AUT: Gold; IRMA: Gold; MC: Platinum; RMNZ: Platinum
Walls	Released: October 14, 2016; Label: RCA; Format: CD, LP, digital download	1	3	1	2	1	2	1	2	1	1	US: 68,000; UK: 100,000	BPI: Platinum; MC: Gold; RMNZ: Platinum
When You See Yourself	Released: March 5, 2021; Label: RCA; Format: CD, LP, digital download	11	1	1	3	6	4	1	2	2	1		BPI: Silver
Can We Please Have Fun	Released: May 10, 2024; Label: LoveTap, Capitol; Format: CD, LP, digital download	35	20	5	12	65	4	2	15	3	2		
O My Beloved	Released: November 6, 2026; Label: LoveTap; Format: CD, LP, digital download	19	3	20	16	30	15	11	19	5	5		
"—" denotes a recording that did not chart or was not released in that territory.

=== Live albums ===
List of live albums
Title	Album details
iTunes Live from SoHo	Released: August 21, 2007 (US); Label: RCA; Formats: Digital download

=== Compilation albums ===
List of compilation albums, with selected chart positions and certifications
Title	Album details	Peak chart positions				Certifications
Title	Album details	AUS	IRL	SCO	UK	Certifications
2CD: Youth and Young Manhood / Aha Shake Heartbreak	Released: October 2, 2006 (UK); Label: Sony BMG; Formats: CD box set	86	38	59	67	BPI: Silver
Boxed	Released: July 6, 2009 (UK); Label: RCA; Formats: CD box set	—	30	17	20	BPI: Gold
"—" denotes a recording that did not chart or was not released in that territory.

=== Video albums ===
List of video albums, with selected chart positions and certifications
Title	Album details	Peak chart positions					Certifications
Title	Album details	US Video	AUS DVD	BEL DVD	NLD DVD	UK Video	Certifications
Live at the O2 London, England	Released: November 10, 2009 (US); Label: RCA; Formats: DVD, Blu-ray	6	2	8	6	7	RIAA: Gold; ARIA: 6× Platinum; BPI: Platinum
Talihina Sky	Released: 2011; Label: RCA; Formats: DVD, Blu-ray	—	—	—	—	—	ARIA: Gold

== Extended plays ==
List of extended plays, with selected chart positions
Title	Extended play details	Peak chart positions		
Title	Extended play details	AUS	SCO	UK
Holy Roller Novocaine (Note: Due to chart regulations involving total lengths of recordings, Holly Roller Novocaine and What I Saw charted on the UK Singles Chart rather than the UK Albums Chart.) (Note: Holly Roller Novocaine charted on the Australian Singles Chart rather than the Australian Albums Chart.)	Released: February 18, 2003 (US); Label: RCA; Formats: CD, 10"	97	65	53
What I Saw	Released: May 26, 2003 (UK); Label: Sony BMG; Formats: CD	—	28	22
Day Old Belgian Blues	Released: June 13, 2006 (US); Label: RCA; Formats: CD	—	—	—
Split: Kings of Leon & Black Rebel Motorcycle Club (with Black Rebel Motorcycle Club)	Released: December 22, 2007 (US); Label: RCA; Formats: Digital download	—	—	—
Live in London	Released: December 23, 2008 (US); Label: RCA; Formats: Digital download	—	—	—
EP #2	Released: November 7, 2025; Label: Love Tap; Formats: Digital download	—	—	—
"—" denotes a recording that did not chart or was not released in that territory.

== Singles ==
=== As lead artist ===
List of singles, with selected chart positions and certifications, showing year released and album name
Title	Year	Peak chart positions										Certifications	Album
Title	Year	US	AUS	BEL	CAN	GER	IRL	NLD	NZ	SWI	UK	Certifications	Album
"Molly's Chambers"	2003	—	—	—	—	—	—	—	—	—	23	BPI: Silver; RMNZ: Gold	Youth and Young Manhood
"Wasted Time"	2003	—	—	—	—	—	—	—	—	—	51		Youth and Young Manhood
"California Waiting"	2004	—	—	—	—	—	—	—	—	—	61		Youth and Young Manhood
"The Bucket"	2004	—	—	—	—	—	28	—	—	—	16	BPI: Gold; RMNZ: Gold	Aha Shake Heartbreak
"Four Kicks"	2005	—	—	—	—	—	32	—	—	—	24		Aha Shake Heartbreak
"King of the Rodeo"	2005	—	—	—	—	—	—	—	—	—	41		Aha Shake Heartbreak
"On Call"	2007	—	— (Note: "On Call" did not enter the Australian ARIA Singles Chart but peaked at number 40 on the ARIA Digital Track Chart.)	— (Note: "On Call" did not enter the Flanders Ultratop 50, but peaked at number 4 on the Ultratip chart.)	—	—	28	—	26	—	18	BPI: Silver; RMNZ: Platinum	Because of the Times
"Fans"	2007	—	—	— (Note: "Fans" did not enter the Flanders Ultratop 50, but peaked at number 13 on the Ultratip chart.)	—	—	13	—	23	—	13	BPI: Gold; RMNZ: Platinum	Because of the Times
"Charmer"	2007	—	—	—	—	—	—	—	—	—	85		Because of the Times
"Sex on Fire"	2008	56	1	9	22	33	1	16	2	35	1	RIAA: Platinum; ARIA: 16× Platinum; BPI: 8× Platinum; BRMA: Platinum; BVMI: 3× Platinum; RMNZ: 11× Platinum	Only by the Night
"Use Somebody"	2008	4	2	1	8	9	2	11	5	9	2	RIAA: Platinum; ARIA: 5× Platinum; BPI: 5× Platinum; BRMA: Platinum; BVMI: Platinum; RMNZ: 7× Platinum	Only by the Night
"Revelry"	2009	—	21	— (Note: "Revelry" did not enter the Flanders Ultratop 50, but peaked at number 19 on the Ultratip chart.)	—	—	—	— (Note: "Revelry" did not enter the Netherlands Single Top 100 but peaked on the Dutch Tipparade Chart at number 13.)	19	—	29	ARIA: Platinum; BPI: Gold; RMNZ: 2× Platinum	Only by the Night
"Notion"	2009	99	46	24	41	69	50	92	25	— (Note: "Notion" did not enter the Swiss Singles chart, but charted at number 78 on the Swiss Airplay chart.)	107	ARIA: Gold; BPI: Silver; RMNZ: Platinum	Only by the Night
"Crawl"	2009	—	70	—	73	—	—	—	—	—	125		Only by the Night
"Radioactive"	2010	37	19	16	19	41	5	36	10	69	7	ARIA: Platinum; BPI: Gold; RMNZ: Platinum	Come Around Sundown
"Pyro"	2010	—	77	42	—	48	43	58	— (Note: "Pyro" did not enter the NZ Top 40 Singles Chart, but peaked at number 36 on the NZ Catalogue Singles Chart.)	74	69	ARIA: Gold; BPI: Platinum; RMNZ: 3× Platinum	Come Around Sundown
"Back Down South"	2011	—	—	— (Note: "Back Down South" did not enter the Flanders Ultratop 50, but peaked at number 9 on the Ultratip chart.)	—	—	—	77	—	—	182	BPI: Silver; RMNZ: Platinum	Come Around Sundown
"Supersoaker"	2013	— (Note: "Supersoaker" did not enter the Billboard Hot 100, but peaked at number six on the Bubbling Under Hot 100 Singles chart.)	43	— (Note: "Supersoaker" did not enter the Flanders Ultratop 50, but peaked at number 4 on the Ultratip chart.)	61	76	19	70	—	— (Note: "Supersoaker" did not enter the Swiss Singles chart, but charted at number 74 on the Swiss Airplay chart.)	32	BPI: Silver; RMNZ: Gold	Mechanical Bull
"Wait for Me"	2013	— (Note: "Wait for Me" did not enter the Billboard Hot 100, but peaked at number one on the Bubbling Under Hot 100 Singles chart.)	— (Note: "Wait for Me" did not enter the ARIA Top 100 Singles Chart, but peaked at number 46 on the ARIA Top 50 On Replay Singles Chart.)	— (Note: "Wait for Me" did not enter the Flanders Ultratop 50, but peaked at number 5 on the Ultratip chart.)	71	34	15	47	— (Note: "Wait for Me" did not enter the NZ Top 40 Singles Chart, but peaked at number seven on the NZ Catalogue Singles Chart.)	39	31	BPI: Gold; RMNZ: Platinum	Mechanical Bull
"Temple"	2013	—	—	— (Note: "Temple" did not enter the Flanders Ultratop 50, but peaked at number 48 on the Ultratip chart.)	86	—	64	— (Note: "Temple" did not enter the Netherlands Single Top 100 but peaked on the Dutch Tipparade Chart at number 15.)	—	—	153		Mechanical Bull
"Beautiful War"	2013	—	—	— (Note: "Beautiful War" did not enter the Flanders Ultratop 50, but peaked at number 10 on the Ultratip chart.)	—	—	87	—	—	— (Note: "Beautiful War" did not enter the Swiss Singles chart, but charted at number 99 on the Swiss Airplay chart.)	98	BPI: Silver	Mechanical Bull
"Waste a Moment"	2016	— (Note: "Waste a Moment" did not enter the Billboard Hot 100, but peaked at number two on the Bubbling Under Hot 100 Singles chart.)	81	11	72	95	44	— (Note: "Waste a Moment" did not enter the Netherlands' Single Top 100 but peaked on the Netherlands' Single Tip Chart at number 9.)	— (Note: "Waste a Moment" did not enter the NZ Top 40 Singles Chart, but peaked at number two on the NZ Heatseekers Singles Chart.)	57	45	BPI: Platinum; RMNZ: Platinum	Walls
"Reverend"	2017	—	—	41	—	—	91	— (Note: "Reverend" did not enter the Netherlands' Single Top 100 but peaked on the Netherlands' Single Tip Chart at number 28.)	— (Note: "Reverend" did not enter the NZ Top 40 Singles Chart, but peaked at number six on the NZ Heatseeker Singles Chart.)	— (Note: "Reverend" did not enter the Swiss Singles chart, but charted at number 83 on the Swiss Airplay chart.)	87		Walls
"Around the World"	2017	—	—	—	—	—	—	— (Note: "Around the World" did not enter the Netherlands' Single Top 100 but peaked on the Netherlands' Single Tip Chart at number 27.)	—	—	— (Note: "Around the World" did not enter the UK Singles Chart, but peaked at number 55 on the UK Singles Sales Chart.)		Walls
"The Bandit" / "100,000 People"	2021	—	—	— (Note: "The Bandit" did not enter the Flanders Ultratop 50, but peaked at number 13 on the Ultratip chart.)	— (Note: "The Bandit" did not enter the Billboard Canadian Hot 100, but peaked at number 39 on the Canadian Digital Song Sales chart.)	—	83	—	— (Note: "The Bandit" did not enter the NZ Top 40 Singles Chart, but peaked at number 29 on the NZ Hot Singles Chart.)	— (Note: "The Bandit" did not enter the Swiss Singles chart, but charted at number 84 on the Swiss Airplay chart.)	74		When You See Yourself
"The Bandit" / "100,000 People"	2021	—	—	— (Note: "100,000 People" did not enter the Flanders Ultratop 50, but charted as an "extra tip" on the Ultratip chart.)	—	—	—	—	—	—	— (Note: "100,000 People" did not enter the UK Singles Chart, but peaked at number 71 on the UK Singles Sales Chart.)		When You See Yourself
"Mustang"	2024	—	—	—	—	—	—	—	— (Note: "Mustang" did not enter the NZ Top 40 Singles Chart, but peaked at number 32 on the NZ Hot Singles Chart.)	—	— (Note: "Mustang" did not enter the UK Singles Chart but debuted and peaked at number 54 on the UK Singles Downloads Chart Top 100 on 1 March 2024.)		Can We Please Have Fun
"Split Screen"	2024	—	—	—	—	—	—	—	— (Note: "Split Screen" did not enter the NZ Top 40 Singles Chart, but peaked at number 17 on the NZ Hot Singles Chart.)	—	—		Can We Please Have Fun
"Nothing to Do"	2024	—	—	—	—	—	—	—	— (Note: "Nothing to Do" did not enter the NZ Top 40 Singles Chart, but peaked at number 38 on the NZ Hot Singles Chart.)	—	—		Can We Please Have Fun
"We're Onto Something" (featuring Zach Bryan)	2025	—	—	—	98	—	56	—	— (Note: "We're Onto Something" did not enter the NZ Top 40 Singles Chart, but peaked at number 12 on the NZ Hot Singles Chart.)	—	— (Note: "We're Onto Something" did not enter the UK Singles Chart, but peaked at number 85 on the UK Singles Sales Chart.)		Non-album single
"To Space"	2025	—	—	—	—	—	—	—	— (Note: "To Space" did not enter the NZ Top 40 Singles Chart, but peaked at number 17 on the NZ Hot Singles Chart.)	—	—		EP #2
"My Whole World"	2026	—	—	—	—	—	—	—	— (Note: "My Whole World" did not enter the NZ Top 40 Singles Chart, but peaked at number 13 on the NZ Hot Singles Chart.)	—	— (Note: "My Whole World" did not enter the UK Singles Chart, but peaked at number 96 on the UK Singles Sales Chart.)		O My Beloved
"Cold Blue Dawn"	2026	—	—	—	—	—	—	—	— (Note: "Cold Blue Dawn" did not enter the NZ Top 40 Singles Chart, but peaked at number 15 on the NZ Hot Singles Chart.)	—	—		O My Beloved
"KOYSAR"	2026	—	—	—	—	—	96	—	— (Note: "KOYSAR" did not enter the NZ Top 40 Singles Chart, but peaked at number 16 on the NZ Hot Singles Chart.)	—	— (Note: "KOYSAR" did not enter the UK Singles Chart, but peaked at number 81 on the UK Singles Sales Chart.)		O My Beloved
"—" denotes a recording that did not chart or was not released in that territory.

=== As featured artist ===
List of singles as featured artist showing year released and album name
Title	Year	Peak chart positions							Album
Title	Year	US	US Country	US Rock	CAN	IRL	NZ Hot	UK	Album
"Bowery" (Zach Bryan featuring Kings of Leon)	2025	81	22	9	54	29	5	89	Non-album single

=== Promotional singles ===
List of songs, with selected chart positions, showing year released and album name
Title	Year	Peak chart positions										Certifications	Album
Title	Year	US Rock	AUS	BEL (FL) Tip	CAN DL	FIN	IRL	NLD Tip	NZ	POL	UK	Certifications	Album
"Red Morning Light"	2003	×	—	—	—	—	—	—	—	—	—		Youth and Young Manhood
"Milk"	2004	×	—	—	—	—	—	—	—	—	—		Aha Shake Heartbreak
"Razz"	2004	×	—	—	—	—	—	—	—	—	—		Aha Shake Heartbreak
"Ragoo"	2007	×	—	—	—	—	—	—	—	—	—		Because of the Times
"Manhattan"	2008	×	38	—	—	—	—	—	—	—	149	ARIA: Gold; BPI: Silver; RMNZ: Gold	Only by the Night
"Pistol of Fire" (Mark Ronson Remix)	2009	—	—	—	—	—	—	—	—	—	—		non-album single
"The Immortals"	2011	—	—	22	—	—	—	—	—	41	—		Come Around Sundown
"Don't Matter"	2014	—	—	—	—	—	—	—	—	—	174		Mechanical Bull
"Family Tree"	2014	— (Note: "Family Tree" did not enter the Hot Rock & Alternative Songs chart, but peaked at number 33 on the Alternative Airplay chart.)	—	—	—	—	—	—	—	—	—		Mechanical Bull
"Walls"	2016	11	95	39	38	—	—	—	— (Note: "Walls" did not enter the NZ Top 40 Singles Chart, but peaked at number three on the NZ Heatseekers Singles Chart.)	46	97	BPI: Silver; RMNZ: Gold	Walls
"Find Me"	2016	29	—	—	—	84	—	28	— (Note: "Find Me" did not enter the NZ Top 40 Singles Chart, but peaked at number four on the NZ Heatseekers Singles Chart.)	—	90	BPI: Silver	Walls
"Stormy Weather"	2021	36	—	26	—	—	90	—	— (Note: "Stormy Weather" did not enter the NZ Top 40 Singles Chart, but peaked at number 16 on the NZ Hot Singles Chart.)	—	88		When You See Yourself
"Echoing"	2021	— (Note: "Echoing" did not enter the Hot Rock & Alternative Songs chart, but peaked at number 49 on the Rock & Alternative Airplay chart.)	—	—	—	—	—	—	—	—	—		When You See Yourself
"Time in Disguise"	2021	— (Note: "Time in Disguise" did not enter the Hot Rock & Alternative Songs chart, but peaked at number 23 on the Rock & Alternative Airplay chart.)	—	—	—	—	—	—	—	—	—		When You See Yourself
"Nowhere to Run"	2024	37	—	—	—	—	—	—	— (Note: "Nowhere to Run" did not enter the NZ Top 40 Singles Chart, but peaked at number 23 on the NZ Hot Singles Chart.)	—	—		Can We Please Have Fun
"—" denotes a recording that did not chart or was not released in that territory. "×" denotes periods where charts did not exist or were not archived.

== Other charted and certified songs ==
List of songs, with selected chart positions, showing year released, certifications and album name
Title	Year	Peak chart positions								Certifications	Album
Title	Year	US	US Rock	BEL (FL)	CAN	CAN Rock	IRE	NZ Hot	UK	Certifications	Album
"Knocked Up"	2007	—	×	— (Note: "Knocked Up" did not enter the Ultratop 50, but peaked at number 29 on the Flemish Back Catalogue Singles chart.)	—	—	—	—	167	BPI: Silver	Because of the Times
"Closer"	2008	—	— (Note: "Closer" did not enter the Hot Rock Songs Chart, but peaked at number 45 on the Rock Digital Song Sales chart.)	—	—	—	—	—	102	BPI: Platinum; RMNZ: 3× Platinum	Only by the Night
"I Want You"	2008	—	×	—	—	—	—	—	—	RMNZ: Gold	Only by the Night
"Frontier City"	2008	—	×	—	—	—	—	—	116		Only by the Night
"The End"	2010	82	— (Note: "The End" did not enter the Hot Rock Songs Chart, but peaked at number 4 on the Rock Digital Song Sales chart.)	—	73	48	—	—	136		Come Around Sundown
"Rock City"	2013	—	—	—	—	—	—	—	— (Note: "Rock City" did not enter the UK Singles Chart, but peaked at number 86 on the UK Streaming Chart.)		Mechanical Bull
"Comeback Story"	2013	—	—	—	—	—	—	—	—	RMNZ: Gold	Mechanical Bull
"Over"	2016	—	37	—	—	—	—	—	—		Walls
"Eyes On You"	2016	—	49	—	—	—	—	—	—		Walls
"When You See Yourself, Are You Far Away"	2021	—	—	—	—	—	—	30	—		When You See Yourself
"A Wave"	2021	—	—	—	—	—	—	39	—		When You See Yourself
"Ballerina Radio"	2024	—	—	—	—	—	—	33	—		Can We Please Have Fun
"All the Little Sheep"	2025	—	—	—	—	—	—	—	— (Note: "All the Little Sheep" did not enter the UK Singles Chart, but peaked at number 22 on the UK Singles Sales Chart.)		EP #2
"The Hand"	2026	—	—	—	—	—	—	12	—		O My Beloved
"Rose"	2026	—	28	—	88	—	88	2	89		O My Beloved
"Feel the Love"	2026	—	—	—	—	—	—	9	—		O My Beloved
"—" denotes a recording that did not chart or was not released in that territory. "×" denotes periods where charts did not exist or were not archived.

== Guest appearances ==
List of guest appearances, showing year released and album name
Title	Year	Album
"Molly's Chambers" (live)	2006	Radio 1's Live Lounge
"Fans" (live)	2007	Radio 1's Live Lounge: Volume 2
"On Call" (live)	2007	The Saturday Sessions: The Dermot O'Leary Show

== Music videos ==
List of music videos, showing year released and director
Title	Year	Director(s)
"Red Morning Light"	2003	Douglas Biro
"Molly's Chambers"	2003	Honey
"Wasted Time"	2003	Mark Pellington
"The Bucket"	2004	Patrick Daughters
"Four Kicks"	2005	Patrick Daughters
"King of the Rodeo"	2005	Patrick Daughters
"On Call"	2007	Adria Petty
"Charmer"	2007	Robert Hales
"Crawl"	2008	Nick Wickham
"Sex on Fire"	2008	Sophie Muller
"Use Somebody"	2008	Sophie Muller
"Notion"	2009	Phil Griffin
"Radioactive"	2010	Sophie Muller
"Pyro"	2010	Max Goldman, Paul Greenhouse, Casey McGrath
"Back Down South"	2011	Casey McGrath
"Supersoaker"	2013	W.I.Z.
"Beautiful War"	2013	Casey McGrath
"Temple"	2014	Casey McGrath
"Waste a Moment"	2016	Dimitri Basil
"Walls"	2016	Casey McGrath
"Around the World"	2016	
"Find Me"	2016	Dimitri Basil
"Reverend"	2017	Dimitri Basil
"Going Nowhere"	2020	Casey McGrath
"The Bandit"	2021	Casey McGrath
"Echoing"	2021	Casey McGrath
"Stormy Weather"	2021	Casey McGrath
"Mustang"	2024	Brook Linder
