= List of songs recorded by Kings of Leon =

Below is a comprehensive list of songs recorded by American rock band Kings of Leon.

== Original songs ==
Title	Album	Year	Length	Status
Andrea	N/A	2003	2:03	Unreleased
Fall	N/A	2003	4:37	Unreleased
Wicker Chair	Holy Roller Novocaine EP	2003	3:10	Released
Molly's Hangover	Wasted Time (Single)	2003	4:22	Released
Red Morning Light	Youth and Young Manhood	2003	3:00	Released
Happy Alone	Youth and Young Manhood	2003	4:00	Released
Wasted Time	Youth and Young Manhood	2003	2:47	Released
Joe's Head	Youth and Young Manhood	2003	3:21	Released
Trani	Youth and Young Manhood	2003	5:01	Released
California Waiting	Youth and Young Manhood	2003	3:29	Released
Spiral Staircase	Youth and Young Manhood	2003	2:55	Released
Molly's Chambers	Youth and Young Manhood	2003	2:16	Released
Genius	Youth and Young Manhood	2003	2:49	Released
Dusty	Youth and Young Manhood	2003	5:14	Released
Holy Roller Novocaine	Youth and Young Manhood	2003	4:02	Released
Talihina Sky	Youth and Young Manhood	2003	3:35	Released
Slow Night, So Long	Aha Shake Heartbreak	2005	3:54	Released
King of the Rodeo	Aha Shake Heartbreak	2005	2:26	Released
Taper Jean Girl	Aha Shake Heartbreak	2005	3:06	Released
Pistol of Fire	Aha Shake Heartbreak	2005	2:21	Released
Milk	Aha Shake Heartbreak	2005	4:00	Released
The Bucket	Aha Shake Heartbreak	2005	2:56	Released
Soft	Aha Shake Heartbreak	2005	2:59	Released
Razz	Aha Shake Heartbreak	2005	2:16	Released
Day Old Blues	Aha Shake Heartbreak	2005	3:33	Released
Four Kicks	Aha Shake Heartbreak	2005	2:09	Released
Velvet Snow	Aha Shake Heartbreak	2005	2:11	Released
Rememo	Aha Shake Heartbreak	2005	3:23	Released
Where Nobody Knows	Aha Shake Heartbreak	2005	2:24	Released
Head To Toe	Four Kicks (Single)	2005	2:06	Released
Knocked Up	Because Of The Times	2007	7:10	Released
Charmer	Because Of The Times	2007	2:57	Released
On Call	Because Of The Times	2007	3:22	Released
McFearless	Because Of The Times	2007	3:09	Released
Black Thumbnail	Because Of The Times	2007	4:00	Released
My Party	Because Of The Times	2007	4:11	Released
True Love Way	Because Of The Times	2007	4:03	Released
Ragoo	Because Of The Times	2007	3:01	Released
Fans	Because Of The Times	2007	3:36	Released
The Runner	Because Of The Times	2007	4:16	Released
Trunk	Because Of The Times	2007	3:57	Released
Camaro	Because Of The Times	2007	3:07	Released
Arizona	Because Of The Times	2007	4:50	Released
My Third House (Bonus Track)	Because Of The Times	2007	4:03	Released
Woo Hoo (Bonus Track)	Because Of The Times	2007	3:31	Released
Closer	Only By The Night	2008	4:00	Released
Crawl	Only By The Night	2008	4:09	Released
Sex On Fire	Only By The Night	2008	3:26	Released
Use Somebody	Only By The Night	2008	3:54	Released
Manhattan	Only By The Night	2008	3:26	Released
Revelry	Only By The Night	2008	3:24	Released
17	Only By The Night	2008	3:10	Released
Notion	Only By The Night	2008	3:03	Released
I Want You	Only By The Night	2008	5:07	Released
Be Somebody	Only By The Night	2008	3:49	Released
Cold Desert	Only By The Night	2008	5:35	Released
Frontier City (Bonus Track)	Only By The Night	2008	3:40	Released
Beneath the Surface (Bonus Track)	Only By The Night	2008	2:48	Released
Lucifer	N/A	2009	3:14	Unreleased
The End	Come Around Sundown	2010	4:24	Released
Radioactive	Come Around Sundown	2010	3:26	Released
Pyro	Come Around Sundown	2010	4:10	Released
Mary	Come Around Sundown	2010	3:25	Released
The Face	Come Around Sundown	2010	3:28	Released
The Immortals	Come Around Sundown	2010	3:29	Released
Back Down South	Come Around Sundown	2010	4:01	Released
Beach Side	Come Around Sundown	2010	2:51	Released
No Money	Come Around Sundown	2010	3:06	Released
Pony Up	Come Around Sundown	2010	3:05	Released
Birthday	Come Around Sundown	2010	3:15	Released
Mi Amigo	Come Around Sundown	2010	4:07	Released
Pickup Truck	Come Around Sundown	2010	4:45	Released
Celebration (Bonus Track)	Come Around Sundown	2010	5:14	Released
Supersoaker	Mechanical Bull	2013	3:50	Released
Rock City	Mechanical Bull	2013	2:56	Released
Don't Matter	Mechanical Bull	2013	2:50	Released
Beautiful War	Mechanical Bull	2013	5:09	Released
Temple	Mechanical Bull	2013	4:10	Released
Wait for Me	Mechanical Bull	2013	3:30	Released
Family Tree	Mechanical Bull	2013	3:50	Released
Comeback Story	Mechanical Bull	2013	3:59	Released
Tonight	Mechanical Bull	2013	4:33	Released
Coming Back Again	Mechanical Bull	2013	3:28	Released
On the Chin	Mechanical Bull	2013	3:46	Released
Work On Me (Bonus Track)	Mechanical Bull	2013	4:04	Released
Last Mile Home (Bonus Track)	Mechanical Bull	2013	4:04	Released
I Love You All The Time	Play It Forward Campaign	2015	4:19	Released
Waste a Moment	Walls	2016	3:03	Released
Reverend	Walls	2016	3:54	Released
Around the World	Walls	2016	3:54	Released
Find Me	Walls	2016	4:05	Released
Over	Walls	2016	6:10	Released
Muchacho	Walls	2016	3:09	Released
Conversation Piece	Walls	2016	4:59	Released
Eyes on You	Walls	2016	4:40	Released
Wild	Walls	2016	3:39	Released
Walls	Walls	2016	5:29	Released
When You See Yourself, Are You Far Away	When You See Yourself	2020	5:48	Released
The Bandit	When You See Yourself	2021	4:11	Released
100,000 People	When You See Yourself	2021	5:44	Released
Stormy Weather	When You See Yourself	2021	3:42	Released
A Wave	When You See Yourself	2021	5:23	Released
Golden Restless Age	When You See Yourself	2021	4:33	Released
Time In Disguise	When You See Yourself	2021	4:46	Released
Supermarket	When You See Yourself	2021	4:58	Released
Claire & Eddie	When You See Yourself	2021	4:53	Released
Echoing	When You See Yourself	2021	3:37	Released
Fairytale	When You See Yourself	2021	3:56	Released
Ballerina Radio	Can We Please Have Fun	2024	3:51	Released
Rainbow Ball	Can We Please Have Fun	2024	4:10	Released
Nowhere To Run	Can We Please Have Fun	2024	3:41	Released
Mustang	Can We Please Have Fun	2024	3:15	Released
Actual Daydream	Can We Please Have Fun	2024	3:19	Released
Splitscreen	Can We Please Have Fun	2024	5:03	Released
Don't Stop The Bleeding	Can We Please Have Fun	2024	3:38	Released
Nothing To Do	Can We Please Have Fun	2024	2:55	Released
M Television	Can We Please Have Fun	2024	3:27	Released
Hesitation Gen	Can We Please Have Fun	2024	3:17	Released
Ease Me On	Can We Please Have Fun	2024	3:28	Released
Seen	Can We Please Have Fun	2024	4:52	Released
We're Onto Something (feat. Zach Bryan)	We're Onto Something	2025	3:42	Released
