= Come Around Sundown World Tour =

2010–11 concert tour by Kings of Leon

- Tour by Kings of Leon
- Promotional ad for tour
- Associated album: Come Around Sundown
- Start date: June 5, 2010
- End date: November 19, 2011
- Legs: 13
- No. of shows: 47 in North America; 32 in Europe; 1 in South America; 2 in Africa; 9 in Australia; 92 Total

Kings of Leon concert chronology
- Only by the Night World Tour (2008–10); Come Around Sundown World Tour (2010–11); Mechanical Bull Tour (2014)

The Come Around Sundown World Tour was the second concert tour by American rock band Kings of Leon. Visiting the Americas, Europe, Africa and Australia, the tour supported the band's fifth studio album, Come Around Sundown (2010). The tour has been praised by both critics and spectators alike, with many dates selling out within minutes. The concerts held in North America (in 2010) grossed over 14 million dollars, becoming the 49th highest-grossing North American tour. The tour ranked 40th in Pollstar's "Top 50 Worldwide Tour (Mid-Year)", earning roughly 20 million dollars in 2011.

== Background ==
After finishing their previous tour, the band began working on their fifth studio album. In a 2009 interview with Billboard, frontman Caleb Followill stated the album would have a similar sound to their debut album, with a chill vibe. After the announcement of the album, the band later announced they would be a headlining act at the 2010 Bonnaroo Music Festival. The tour was officially announced via the band's official website in April 2010. The album was not due for release until October 2010 and the band was hesitant to showcase the new music to the public. However, they all felt that their fans did not want a continuation of their last tour. They further elaborated,

"I think if we were to go out there, play a concert right now and not play some new music, it would feel like we had our hands tied and I think we would be bored with the show. We didn't want to go back out there and give them 'Only By the Night Tour' Part 2. It's inspiring to us to be able to go out there and play a new song. ... If we were going out there and not playing these songs, I don't think that we would have the spark and the smile on our face that we do at this point."

The tour proved to be successful in all regions, especially in Europe where the band sold-out concerts within minutes and embarked on their first stadium tour in the region. However, the tour faced a few hiccups along the way. The tour made media headlines in July 2010 when the band cancelled a concert at the Verizon Wireless Amphitheater in Maryland Heights, Missouri after experiencing substantial amounts of fecal matter from pigeons. Additional headlines were when the band's tour bus caught on fire at the loading dock for The O_{2} Arena in London, England. The Australian leg of the tour has been postponed until November 2011 to allow drummer Nathan Followill to recover after surgery for a torn right labrum and biceps.

== Opening acts ==
- The Whigs (North America—Leg 2 & June 2010) (Europe—Leg 1, select dates)
- The Black Keys (North America—Leg 2)
- The Drums (London—June 2010)
- The Features (London—June 2010) (North America—Leg 1, select dates)
- Built to Spill (North America—Leg 1)
- The Stills (North America—Leg 1, select dates)
- Manchester Orchestra (New York City—November 2010)
- Band of Horses (North America—April 2011, Australia)
- Paul Weller (Hyde Park—June 2011)
- Zac Brown Band (Europe—Leg 2, select dates)
- Thin Lizzy (Slane Castle)
- Elbow (Slane Castle)
- White Lies (Europe—Leg 2, select dates)
- Mona (Europe—Leg 2, select dates)
- The Whigs (Slane Castle & The O2 Arena, London)
- The Walkmen (Europe—Leg 2, select dates)

== Setlist ==
North America

June 2010

1. "Radioactive"
2. "Crawl"
3. "My Party"
4. "Taper Jean Girl"
5. "Wasted Time
6. "Fans"
7. "Milk"
8. "Mary"
9. "Four Kicks"
10. "The Bucket"
11. "Molly's Chambers"
12. "The Immortals"
13. "Sex on Fire"
14. "Notion"
15. "On Call"
16. "Back Down South"
17. "Slow Night, So Long"

Encore

18. "Knocked Up"
19. "Manhattan"
20. "Use Somebody"
21. "Closer"

Leg 1

1. "Crawl"
2. "Slow Night, So Long"
3. "My Party"
4. "Molly's Chambers"
5. "Mary"
6. "Fans"
7. "Milk"
8. "Closer"
9. "Four Kicks"
10. "Charmer"
11. "The Bucket"
12. "Radioactive"
13. "Notion"
14. "Sex on Fire"
15. "On Call"
16. "Back Down South"
17. "Trani"

Encore

18. "Knocked Up"
19. "Use Somebody"
20. "Black Thumbnail"

Leg 2

1. "Crawl"
2. "Molly's Chambers"
3. "My Party"
4. "Mary"
5. "Fans"
6. "Revelry"
7. "Closer"
8. "Pyro"
9. "Four Kicks"
10. "The Bucket"
11. "Notion"
12. "Radioactive"
13. "Sex on Fire"
14. "On Call"
15. "Back Down South"
16. "Trani"

Encore

17. "Knocked Up"
18. "Manhattan"
19. "Use Somebody"
20. "Black Thumbnail"
Europe

Leg 1

1. "Closer"
2. "Crawl"
3. "Razz"
4. "Molly's Chambers"
5. "King of the Rodeo"
6. "Joe's Head"
7. "Fans"
8. "Revelry"
9. "Milk"
10. "Four Kicks"
11. "Pistol of Fire"
12. "Wasted Time"
13. "Sex on Fire"
14. "The Bucket"
15. "Notion"
16. "Use Somebody"
17. "On Call"
18. "Cold Desert"
19. "Trani"

Encore

20. "Knocked Up"
21. "Charmer"
22. "Slow Night, So Long"
23. "Black Thumbnail"

Slane Castle—May 28, 2011

1. "Four Kicks"
2. "Taper Jean Girl"
3. "The Bucket"
4. "Spiral Staircase"
5. "McFearless"
6. "The Immortals"
7. "Revelry"
8. "Fans"
9. "Back Down South"
10. "Sex On Fire"
11. "Crawl"
12. "My Party"
13. "Happy Alone"
14. "Charmer"
15. "Notion"
16. "Cold Desert"
17. "Closer"
18. "Pyro"
19. "Mary"
20. "Molly's Chambers"
21. "Mi Amigo"
22. "No Money"
23. "Radioactive"
24. "On Call"
25. "Trani"

Encore

26. "The Runner Caleb Solo"
27. "Manhattan"
28. "Use Somebody"
29. "Black Thumbnail"
Festivals

England—;August 2010

1. "Crawl"
2. "Slow Night, So Long"
3. "My Party"
4. "Molly's Chambers"
5. "Mary"
6. "Fans"
7. "Milk"
8. "Closer"
9. "Four Kicks"
10. "Charmer"
11. "The Bucket"
12. "Radioactive"
13. "Notion"
14. "Sex on Fire"
15. "On Call"
16. "Back Down South"
17. "Trani"

Encore

18. "Knocked Up"
19. "Use Somebody"
20. "Black Thumbnail"

North America

(except the Bonnaroo Music Festival)

1. "Closer"
2. "Be Somebody"
3. "My Party"
4. "Radioactive"
5. "Fans"
6. "Milk"
7. "Pickup Truck"
8. "Where Is My Mind?"
9. "Mary"
10. "Crawl"
11. "Four Kicks"
12. "The Bucket"
13. "Notion"
14. "Sex on Fire"
15. "On Call"
16. "Back Down South"

Encore

17. "Knocked Up"
18. "Manhattan"
19. "Use Somebody"
20. "Black Thumbnail"

== Tour dates ==
Date	City	Country	Venue
North America
June 5, 2010	Atlantic City	United States	Borgata Events Center
June 6, 2010	Saratoga Springs	United States	Saratoga Performing Arts Center
June 11, 2010^{[A]}	Manchester	United States	Great Stage Park
Europe
June 30, 2010	London	England	Hyde Park
North America
July 9, 2010	Chula Vista	United States	Cricket Wireless Amphitheatre
July 10, 2010	Phoenix	United States	Cricket Wireless Pavilion
July 12, 2010	Los Angeles	United States	Hollywood Bowl
July 14, 2010	Irvine	United States	Verizon Wireless Amphitheatre
July 17, 2010	George	United States	The Gorge Amphitheatre
July 19, 2010	West Valley City	United States	USANA Amphitheatre
July 20, 2010	Greenwood Village	United States	Comfort Dental Amphitheatre
July 24, 2010	Tinley Park	United States	First Midwest Bank Amphitheatre
July 26, 2010	Cuyahoga Falls	United States	Blossom Music Center
July 28, 2010	Toronto	Canada	Molson Amphitheatre
July 30, 2010	Darien	United States	Darien Lake Performing Arts Center
July 31, 2010	Clarkston	United States	DTE Energy Music Theatre
August 3, 2010	Hartford	United States	Comcast Theatre
August 5, 2010	Camden	United States	Susquehanna Bank Center
August 7, 2010	Bristow	United States	Jiffy Lube Live
August 15, 2010^{[B]}	San Francisco	United States	Polo Field
Europe
August 21, 2010^{[C]}	Chelmsford	England	Hylands Park
August 22, 2010^{[C]}	Weston-under-Lizard	England	Weston Park
North America
September 3, 2010	Noblesville	United States	Verizon Wireless Music Center
September 4, 2010	Cincinnati	United States	Riverbend Music Center
September 10, 2010	Charlotte	United States	Verizon Wireless Amphitheatre
September 11, 2010	Virginia Beach	United States	Virginia Beach Amphitheater
September 13, 2010	Raleigh	United States	Time Warner Cable Music Pavilion
September 15, 2010	Atlanta	United States	Aaron's Amphitheatre
September 17, 2010	West Palm Beach	United States	Cruzan Amphitheatre
September 18, 2010	Tampa	United States	1-800-ASK-GARY Amphitheatre
September 20, 2010	Pelham	United States	Verizon Wireless Music Center
September 22, 2010	The Woodlands	United States	Cynthia Woods Mitchell Pavilion
September 23, 2010	Dallas	United States	Superpages.com Center
South America
October 10, 2010^{[D]}	Itu	Brazil	Maeda Farm
North America
November 14, 2010	Boston	United States	TD Garden
November 16, 2010	New York City	United States	Madison Square Garden
Europe
November 29, 2010	Antwerp	Belgium	Sportpaleis
December 1, 2010	Madrid	Spain	Palacio Vistalegre
December 3, 2010	Casalecchio di Reno	Italy	Futurshow Station
December 4, 2010	Vienna	Austria	Wiener Stadthalle
December 6, 2010	Munich	Germany	Olympiahalle
December 8, 2010	Hamburg	Germany	O_{2} World Hamburg
December 9, 2010	Frankfurt	Germany	Festhalle Frankfurt
December 11, 2010	Dublin	Ireland	The O_{2}
December 13, 2010	Manchester	England	Manchester Evening News Arena
December 14, 2010	Sheffield	England	Motorpoint Arena Sheffield
December 16, 2010	Birmingham	England	National Indoor Arena
December 17, 2010	Birmingham	England	National Indoor Arena
December 19, 2010	Sheffield	England	Motorpoint Arena Sheffield
North America
April 8, 2011	Tulsa	United States	BOK Center
April 9, 2011	Memphis	United States	FedExForum
April 12, 2011	Austin	United States	Frank Erwin Center
April 15, 2011^{[E]}	Indio	United States	Empire Polo Fields
Europe
May 28, 2011	Slane	Ireland	Slane Castle
May 30, 2011	Coventry	England	Ricoh Arena
June 1, 2011	London	England	The O_{2} Arena
June 3, 2011^{[F]}	Nuremberg	Germany	Zeppelinfeld
June 4, 2011^{[G]}	Nürburg	Germany	Nürburgring
June 10, 2011^{[H]}	Newport	England	Seaclose Park
June 12, 2011^{[I]}	Landgraaf	Netherlands	Megaland Landgaaf
June 14, 2011	Berlin	Germany	Waldbühne
June 17, 2011	Sunderland	England	Stadium of Light
June 19, 2011	Manchester	England	Lancashire County Cricket Ground
June 22, 2011	London	England	Hyde Park
June 23, 2011	London	England	Hyde Park
June 26, 2011	Edinburgh	Scotland	Murrayfield Stadium
June 29, 2011^{[J]}	Borlänge	Sweden	Borlänge Centrumförening
July 1, 2011^{[K]}	Rotselaar	Belgium	Werchter Festival Grounds
July 3, 2011^{[L]}	Roskilde	Denmark	Roskilde Showgrounds
North America
July 25, 2011	Orange Beach	United States	The Amphitheater at The Wharf
July 27, 2011	Atlanta	United States	Aaron's Amphitheatre
September 28, 2011	Vancouver	Canada	Rogers Arena
September 30, 2011	Calgary	Canada	Scotiabank Saddledome
October 1, 2011	Edmonton	Canada	Rexall Place
October 3, 2011	Saskatoon	Canada	Credit Union Centre
October 4, 2011	Winnipeg	Canada	MTS Centre
October 8, 2011	London	Canada	John Labatt Centre
October 11, 2011	Toronto	Canada	Air Canada Centre
October 14, 2011	Montreal	Canada	Bell Centre
October 15, 2011	Ottawa	Canada	Scotiabank Place
Africa
October 26, 2011	Cape Town	South Africa	Cape Town Stadium
October 29, 2011	Johannesburg	South Africa	FNB Stadium
Australia
November 4, 2011	Sydney	Australia	Allphones Arena
November 5, 2011	Sydney	Australia	Allphones Arena
November 8, 2011	Brisbane	Australia	Brisbane Entertainment Centre
November 9, 2011	Gold Coast	Australia	GCCEC Arena
November 11, 2011	Adelaide	Australia	Adelaide Entertainment Centre
November 13, 2011	Melbourne	Australia	Rod Laver Arena
November 14, 2011	Melbourne	Australia	Rod Laver Arena
November 16, 2011	Melbourne	Australia	Rod Laver Arena
November 19, 2011	Perth	Australia	nib Stadium

Festivals and other miscellaneous performances

^{A} This concert is a part of the Bonnaroo Music Festival
^{B} This concert is a part of the Outside Lands Music and Arts Festival
^{C} These concerts are a part of V Festival
^{D} This concert is a part of the SWU Music & Arts Festival
^{E} This concert is a part of Coachella Valley Music and Arts Festival
^{F} This concert is a part of Rock im Park

^{G} This concert is a part of Rock am Ring
^{H} This concert is a part of the Isle of Wight Festival
^{I} This concert is a part of the Pinkpop Festival
^{J} This concert is a part of the Peace & Love Music Festival
^{K} This concert is a part of Rock Werchter
^{L} This concert is a part of the Roskilde Festival

Cancellations and rescheduled shows

June 8, 2010	Scranton	Toyota Pavilion at Montage Mountain	Cancelled
July 23, 2010	Maryland Heights	Verizon Wireless Amphitheater	Cancelled after performing three songs
September 7, 2010	Burgettstown	First Niagara Pavilion	Cancelled
September 8, 2010	Hershey	Hersheypark Stadium	Cancelled
November 18, 2010	East Rutherford	Izod Center	Cancelled
December 21, 2010	London	The O_{2} Arena	Postponed then later rescheduled to June 20, 2011
March 8, 2011	Brisbane	Brisbane Entertainment Centre	Postponed then later rescheduled to November 8, 2011
March 10, 2011	Sydney	Acer Arena	Postponed then later rescheduled to November 5, 2011
March 11, 2011	Sydney	Acer Arena	Postponed then later rescheduled to November 6, 2011
March 13, 2011	Adelaide	Adelaide Entertainment Centre	Postponed then later rescheduled to November 11, 2011
March 17, 2011	Melbourne	Rod Laver Arena	Postponed then later rescheduled to November 13, 2011
March 18, 2011	Melbourne	Rod Laver Arena	Postponed then later rescheduled to November 14, 2011
March 21, 2011	Perth	nib Stadium	Postponed then later rescheduled to November 19, 2011
March 24, 2011	Cape Town	Cape Town Stadium	Postponed then later rescheduled to October 26, 2011
March 27, 2011	Johannesburg	FNB Stadium	Postponed then later rescheduled to October 29, 2011
July 29, 2011	Dallas	Superpages.com Center	Cancelled mid show
July 30, 2011	The Woodlands	Cynthia Woods Mitchell Pavilion	Cancelled
August 2, 2011	Tampa	1-800-ASK-GARY Amphitheatre	Cancelled
August 3, 2011	West Palm Beach	Cruzan Amphitheatre	Cancelled
August 5, 2011	Charlotte	Verizon Wireless Amhitheatre	Cancelled
August 6, 2011	Virginia Beach	Virginia Beach Amphitheater	Cancelled
August 9, 2011	Bristow	Jiffy Lube Live	Cancelled
August 10, 2011	Wantagh	Nikon at Jones Beach Theatre	Cancelled
August 12, 2011	Camden	Susquehanna Bank Centre	Cancelled
August 13, 2011	Hartford	Comcast Theatre	Cancelled
August 16, 2011	Darien	Darien Lake Performing Arts Center	Cancelled
August 17, 2011	Holmden Township	PNC Bank Arts Center	Cancelled
August 19, 2011	Mansfield	Comcast Center	Cancelled
August 20, 2011	Saratoga Springs	Saratoga Performing Arts Center	Cancelled
August 23, 2011	Clarkston	DTE Energy Music Theatre	Cancelled
August 24, 2011	Cincinnati	Riverbend Music Center	Cancelled
August 26, 2011	Tinley Park	First Midwest Bank Amphitheatre	Cancelled
August 27, 2011	Noblesville	Verizon Wireless Music Center	Cancelled
August 29, 2011	Bonner Springs	Capitol Federal Park	Cancelled
August 31, 2011	Morrison	Red Rocks Amphitheatre	Cancelled
September 1, 2011	Morrison	Red Rocks Amphitheatre	Cancelled
September 3, 2011	Las Vegas	Mandalay Bay Events Center	Cancelled
September 4, 2011	Chula Vista	Cricket Wireless Amphitheatre	Cancelled
September 6, 2011	Phoenix	Ashley Furniture HomeStore Pavilion	Cancelled
September 8, 2011	Irvine	Verizon Wireless Amphitheatre	Cancelled
September 10, 2011	Mountain View	Shoreline Amphitheatre	Cancelled
September 12, 2011	Seattle	Cancelled

=== Box office score data ===
Venue	City	Tickets sold / available	Gross revenue
Hollywood Bowl	Los Angeles	17,096 / 17,096 (100%)	$958,351
DTE Energy Music Center	Clarkston	14,571 / 14,571 (100%)	$474,996
Madison Square Garden	New York City	14,712 / 14,712 (100%)	$809,160
Sportpaleis	Antwerp	16,878 / 16,884 (~100%)	$1,149,560
O_{2} World Hamburg	Hamburg	12,350 / 12,350 (100%)	$651,337
The O_{2}	Dublin	12,615 / 12,615 (100%)	$1,047,570
Manchester Evening News Arena	Manchester	16,928 / 16,928 (100%)	$1,376,830
Frank Erwin Center	Austin	10,140 / 11,629 (87%)	$419,436
BOK Center	Tulsa	11,505 / 11,505 (100%)	$497,141
Slane Castle^{[A]}	Slane	79,686 / 79,686 (100%)	$8,248,480
The O_{2} Arena	London	17,071 / 17,615 (97%)	$1,528,670
The Amphitheater at the Wharf	Orange Beach	7,370 / 9,784 (75%)	$318,138
Rexall Place	Edmonton	8,891 / 11,346 (78%)	$498,572
John Labatt Centre	London	7,083 / 8,388 (84%)	$426,590
Air Canada Centre	Toronto	12,386 / 12,386 (100%)	$793,300
Bell Centre	Montreal	5,986 / 6,436 (93%)	$402,171
Allphones Arena	Sydney	20,246 / 22,452 (90%)	$2,412,370
Brisbane Entertainment Centre	Brisbane	10,882 / 11,525 (94%)	$1,359,810
Rod Laver Arena	Melbourne	25,478 / 27,219 (94%)	$3,038,140
TOTAL		321,874 / 335,127 (96%)	$26,410,622

Notes
^{A} This concert ranked third in the Billboard's "Hot Tours" for May 2011.

== Critical reception ==
Kevin Courtney (The Irish Times) praised the performance at The O_{2} stating the band was ready to play stadiums. He further remarked, "[…] this was a southern rock version of U2, delivering big anthems with a twang, and lassoing the audience with well-aimed riffs and chant-along choruses". On the contrary, Ed Power (The Daily Telegraph) gave the same concert two out of five stars stating, "Today, any whiff of the exotic is thoroughly dissipated. Shrugging off last summer's Spinal Tap-like 'pigeongate' debacle (they cut short an outdoor US performance after bird droppings starting raining down from the rafters) Kings of Leon came to Dublin in the straightforward guise of stadium-filling mega-band".
David Dunn (Sheffield Star) stated the band was very lucky after viewing the concert at the Motorpoint Arena. He continued to write "[…] and their many other musical lightning strikes is the same: glee, euphoria, unwavering adoration". James Watkins (Shropshire Star) thought highly of the performance at the National Indoor Arena. He wrote, "Highlight of the night was the spine-tingling and epic Pyro, that saw mobile phones held in the air to light up the whole arena in a 4-minute moment of pure magic".
