= Live at the O2 London, England =

- Directed by: Nick Wickham
- Produced by: Emer Patten
- Starring: Kings of Leon
- Music by: Kings of Leon
- Distributed by: Splinter Films
- Release date: November 10, 2009
- Running time: 100 minutes
- Language: English

Live at the O2 London, England is a DVD by Kings of Leon released on November 10, 2009. It features the band's show on June 30, 2009, at the O2 Arena in London, England. The concert was also released on Blu-ray.

== Track listing ==
1. "Notion"
2. "Be Somebody"
3. "Taper Jean Girl"
4. "My Party"
5. "Molly's Chambers"
6. "Red Morning Light"
7. "Fans"
8. "California Waiting"
9. "Milk"
10. "Closer"
11. "Crawl"
12. "Four Kicks"
13. "Charmer"
14. "Sex on Fire"
15. "The Bucket"
16. "On Call"
17. "Cold Desert"
18. "Use Somebody"
19. "Slow Night, So Long"
20. "Knocked Up"
21. "Manhattan"
22. "Black Thumbnail"

== Personnel ==
- Caleb Followill - lead vocals, rhythm guitar
- Nathan Followill - drums, backing vocals
- Jared Followill - bass, synthesizer, backing vocals
- Matthew Followill - lead guitar, backing vocals

== Charts ==
Chart (2009)	Peak position
Australian Music DVDs Chart	2
Austrian Music DVDs Chart	10
Belgian (Flanders) Music DVDs Chart	2
Belgian (Wallonia) Music DVDs Chart	9
Danish Music DVDs Chart	10
Dutch Music DVDs Chart	6
Irish Music DVDs Chart	2
New Zealand Music DVDs Chart	1
Norwegian Music DVDs Chart	9
Swiss Music DVDs Chart	9
UK Music DVDs Chart	7

== Certifications ==
Region	Certification	Certified units/sales
Australia (ARIA)	6× Platinum	90,000^{^}
Ireland (IRMA)	Gold	2,000^{^}
New Zealand (RMNZ)	Platinum	5,000^{^}
United States (RIAA)	Gold	50,000^{^}
^{^} Shipments figures based on certification alone.
