= Day Old Belgian Blues =

EP by Kings of Leon
- Released: June 13, 2006
- Recorded: November 4, 2004; Brussels, Belgium; (AB Box)
- Genre: Southern rock; garage rock
- Length: 19:51
- Label: RCA
- Producer: Stef Van Alsenoy, Greg Calbi

Kings of Leon chronology
Aha Shake Heartbreak (2004)	Day Old Belgian Blues (2006)	Because of the Times (2007)

Day Old Belgian Blues is a limited edition EP from the American band Kings of Leon, originally recorded at the AB Box in Brussels, Belgium on 4 November 2004. The title of the EP plays on the song name "Day Old Blues" from their second album Aha Shake Heartbreak, though the song does not appear on the EP. The EP was later available together with the Belgian magazine HUMO and was released on vinyl on 29 November 2019 as part of the Black Friday of the Record Store Day.

== Track listing ==
No.	Title	Writer(s)	Length
1.	"Taper Jean Girl" (live)	Caleb Followill, Nathan Followill, Jared Followill, Matthew Followill	3:15
2.	"The Bucket" (live)	C. Followill, N. Followill, J. Followill, M. Followill	3:07
3.	"Soft" (live)	C. Followill, N. Followill, Angelo Petraglia	3:01
4.	"Molly's Chambers" (live)	C. Followill, N. Followill, A. Petraglia	2:45
5.	"Four Kicks" (live)	C. Followill, N. Followill, J. Followill, M. Followill	2:41
6.	"Trani" (live)	C. Followill, N. Followill, A. Petraglia	5:42
