= Holy Roller Novocaine =

EP by Kings of Leon
- Released: February 2003
- Genre: Garage rock; Southern rock
- Length: 15:01
- Label: RCA
- Producer: Ethan Johns; Ryan Adams

Kings of Leon chronology
Holy Roller Novocaine (2003)	What I Saw EP (2003)

Professional ratings
Review scores
Source	Rating
AllMusic	4/5 stars
Pitchfork	7.1/10
Rolling Stone	4/5 stars
The Rolling Stone Album Guide	3/5 stars

Holy Roller Novocaine is the debut EP by American rock band Kings of Leon, released on February 18, 2003. It was re-released as a 10" red vinyl single in April 2013 to celebrate Record Store Day.

== Background ==
The EP was released a few months before Kings of Leon's debut full-length album, Youth & Young Manhood, hit the shelves, and it garnered significant attention from music critics. The song "Molly's Chambers" appeared in a Volkswagen Jetta commercial, and the song "Holy Roller Novocaine" is used at the end of the episode "Playing Tight" of the third season of The Shield. The songs range from bluesy sounds to organ-infused ballads.

Of the five songs on the EP, only "Wicker Chair" did not appear on Youth & Young Manhood (although it, too, was included in the Japanese release of that album), nor has it been included in any later major releases—just a few singles. The recordings of "Molly's Chambers" and "Holy Roller Novocaine" are the same on the EP and the album, but "Wasted Time" and "California Waiting" are different: the version of "Wasted Time" on the EP has a more tense guitar riff and different vocal stylings than that on the album, and "California Waiting" is less distorted. "California Waiting" was recorded in a rush to finish the EP, but the band initially didn't like the outcome, so they recorded a new arrangement for Youth and Young Manhood. However, on Kings of Leon's VH1 Storytellers performance, Caleb Followill stated, before playing "California Waiting", that "We kind of sabotaged it on our album, and tried to play it really punk rock. It was better on the EP I think."

== Track listing ==
All songs written by Caleb Followill, Nathan Followill and Angelo Petraglia.

1. "Molly's Chambers" – 2:16
2. "Wasted Time" – 2:47
3. "California Waiting" – 3:28
4. "Wicker Chair" – 3:08
5. "Holy Roller Novocaine" – 4:01

== Charts ==
Chart performance for Holy Roller Novocaine
Chart (2003)	Peak position
Australia (ARIA)	97
UK Singles (OCC)	53
