= Talihina Sky =

Talihina Sky: The Story of Kings of Leon
- Directed by: Stephen C. Mitchell
- Produced by: Casey McGrath; Joshua Levine
- Starring: Caleb Followill; Jared Followill; Nathan Followill; Matthew Followill
- Edited by: Paul Greenhouse
- Distributed by: Showtime Networks; Sony Music Entertainment
- Release date: June 25, 2011 (Ireland)
- Running time: 87 minutes
- Country: United States
- Language: English

Talihina Sky: The Story of Kings of Leon is a 2011 rockumentary which follows the Kings of Leon throughout their journey from obscurity to fame to the future. The film was named after the hidden track on their Youth & Young Manhood album.

== Cast ==
Kings of Leon

- Caleb Followill as himself
- Jared Followill as himself
- Matthew Followill as himself
- Nathan Followill as himself

== Release ==
The film debuted in Ireland on June 25, 2011, and had its U.S. television premiere on August 21, 2011. In September 2011, the film screened at Helsinki International Film Festival in Finland and Athens International Film Festival in Greece, and in October 2011, it screened at Flanders International Film Festival Ghent in Belgium.

== Reception ==
=== Awards and nominations ===
- 2011, received a Grammy Award nomination for 'Best Long Form Music Video'.
