= Back Down South =

Single by Kings of Leon

from the album Come Around Sundown
- Released: May 17, 2011
- Recorded: 2010
- Genre: Southern rock; acoustic rock; country pop; swamp pop
- Length: 4:01
- Label: RCA
- Songwriters: Caleb Followill; Nathan Followill; Jared Followill; Matthew Followill
- Producers: Angelo Petraglia; Jacquire King

Kings of Leon singles chronology
"Pyro" (2010)	"Back Down South" (2011)	"Supersoaker" (2013)

Music video
- "Back Down South" on YouTube

"Back Down South" (also called "Southbound") is a song by American rock band Kings of Leon from their 2010 album Come Around Sundown. It was released as the third and final single from the album May 17, 2011.

== Music video ==
A music video to accompany the release of "Back Down South" was first released onto YouTube on May 27, 2011, at a total length of four minutes and five seconds. It was directed by Casey McGrath with part of the filming in Nashville, TN and the other half in Hampshire, TN. William Goodman of Spin described the video as "an advert for their country way of life."

== Reception ==
Scott Shelter from PopCrush gave the song an 8/10 grade, commenting, "With a dash of twang and an intentional down-home appeal, ‘Back Down South’ wouldn't sound out of place at a country music festival or awards show. It's a welcome change of pace from the arena-rock direction of the band's recent music."

== Live performances ==
Kings of Leon first performed the song during their summer tour 2010. They also performed it on Later... with Jools Holland.

== Track listings ==
Digital download

1. "Back Down South" – 4:01

== Credits and personnel ==
Kings of Leon

- Caleb Followill – Vocals and guitar – Gibson PR-720S
- Matthew Followill – Lead guitar and Lap steel guitar – Gibson Guitar
- Jared Followill – Bass guitar – Gibson Thunderbird
- Nathan Followill – Drums, percussion, backing vocals – DW Drums
- Robert Mallory – Fiddle
- Angela Petraglia and Liam O'Neil – Organ – Hammond B3
- Producers – Angelo Petraglia, Jacquire King
- Lyrics – Caleb Followill, Nathan Followill, Jared Followill, Matthew Followill
- Label – RCA Records

== Charts ==
Chart (2011)	Peak position
Belgium (Ultratip Bubbling Under Flanders)	9
Belgium (Ultratip Bubbling Under Wallonia)	41
Netherlands (Single Top 100)	77
US Adult Alternative Airplay (Billboard)	29

== Certifications ==
Certifications for "Back Down South"
Region	Certification	Certified units/sales
New Zealand (RMNZ)	Platinum	30,000^{‡}
^{‡} Sales+streaming figures based on certification alone.
