= O My Beloved =

Studio album by Kings of Leon
- Released: November 6, 2026
- Studio: Neon Leon (Nashville)
- Genres: Southern rock; Americana; country rock
- Length: 49:43
- Label: LoveTap
- Producers: Kings of Leon; Liam O'Neil

Kings of Leon chronology
EP #2 (2025)	O My Beloved (2026)

O My Beloved is the tenth studio album by the American rock band Kings of Leon. It was released on November 6, 2026, through the band's LoveTap Records label, distributed by Virgin Music Group.

== Background ==
O My Beloved was announced by Kings of Leon on September 10, 2026. Frontman Caleb Followill initially began work on new music in Spring 2025. However, with a few songs already completed, Caleb sustained a foot injury. After the band cancelled their then-forthcoming European tour, they collectively decided to shelve the previously completed songs and take on more of a stripped-back and melancholic approach in contrast to their previous releases. Of this decision, Caleb stated in a press release that the new music took on entirely different meanings and he no longer felt connected to the scrapped material. Caleb's brother and fellow bandmate Jared Followill further commented about the change in direction, citing this album being the band's first to be entirely self-produced for allowing them to pursue it.

== Promotion ==
The album's lead single, "My Whole World", was released on September 10, 2026 in tandem with the album's announcement. An accompanying music for the song was released the same day. The second single, "Cold Blue Dawn", was released on September 30, 2026. Kings of Leon partnered with the Weather Channel to create a lyric video for the song utilizing satellite imagery from NASA after TWC used the band's 2010 single "Pyro" in a viral video about weather formations. The third single, "KOYSAR" (an acronym for Kick Off Your Shoes and Run), was released on October 16, 2026.

== Track listing ==
All tracks are written by Caleb Followill, Jared Followill, Nathan Followill, and Matthew Followill.

O My Beloved track listing
No.	Title	Length
1.	"Intro"	0:58
2.	"My Whole World"	4:07
3.	"Cold Blue Dawn"	4:35
4.	"The Hand"	4:08
5.	"Rose"	3:25
6.	"Make It Count"	3:59
7.	"KOYSAR"	3:17
8.	"Feel the Love"	4:01
9.	"Blue Jeans and Diamonds"	3:55
10.	"Warm Company"	3:37
11.	"Forever Endeavor"	4:08
12.	"Pretty Thing"	4:53
13.	"Get You Down"	4:40
Total length:		49:43

== Personnel ==
Credits are adapted from Tidal.

=== Kings of Leon ===
- Caleb Followill – vocals, production (all tracks); acoustic guitar (tracks 1–4, 6–13), electric guitar (4–6, 9), synthesizer (8, 11), shaker (11)
- Jared Followill – production (all tracks), bass guitar (2–12), background vocals (6, 7, 9, 10), synthesizer (8, 11), baritone guitar (11), acoustic guitar (12)
- Matthew Followill – production (all tracks), electric guitar (2–12), pedal steel guitar (2–5, 9, 12), banjo (2), acoustic guitar (4, 5, 8, 9), percussion (5), background vocals (6, 7, 9, 10); baritone guitar, mandolin (11)
- Nathan Followill – production (all tracks), drums (2–13), shaker (3–6, 8, 11, 13), tambourine (3, 4, 6, 10, 11), background vocals (6, 7, 9, 10, 13), bongos (8)

=== Additional contributors ===
- Liam O'Neil – production, engineering (all tracks); synthesizer (4, 8, 10, 11, 13), Hammond organ (5–7, 12), piano (9, 10), violin (9), Wurlitzer (11)
- Brent Rawlings – engineering assistance
- Ryan Hewitt – mixing
- Max Challis – mixing assistance
- Tyler Spratt – mixing assistance
- Ted Jensen – mastering
- Austin Hoke – cello (4, 6–9, 12, 13)
- Kristin Weber – violin (4, 6, 8, 12), viola (7, 13)

== Charts ==
Chart performance for O My Beloved
Chart (2026)	Peak position
Australian Albums (ARIA)	3
Austrian Albums (Ö3 Austria)	20
Belgian Albums (Ultratop Flanders)	16
Belgian Albums (Ultratop Wallonia)	13
Canadian Albums (Billboard)	30
Dutch Albums (Album Top 100)	19
French Albums (SNEP)	142
French Rock & Metal Albums (SNEP)	13
German Albums (Offizielle Top 100)	15
German Rock & Metal Albums (Offizielle Top 100)	5
Irish Albums (Official Charts)	11
Irish Independent Albums (IRMA)	3
Lithuanian Albums (AGATA)	71
New Zealand Albums (RMNZ)	5
Polish Albums (ZPAV)	28
Portuguese Albums (AFP)	144
Scottish Albums (Official Charts)	6
Swiss Albums (Schweizer Hitparade)	15
UK Albums (Official Charts)	5
UK Americana Albums (Official Charts)	1
UK Independent Albums (Official Charts)	2
US Billboard 200	19
US Independent Albums (Billboard)	2
US Top Rock & Alternative Albums (Billboard)	4
