= Pyro (song) =

Single by Kings of Leon

from the album Come Around Sundown
- Released: December 9, 2010
- Recorded: 2010
- Genre: Alternative rock; Southern rock
- Length: 4:10
- Label: RCA
- Songwriters: Caleb Followill; Nathan Followill; Jared Followill; Matthew Followill
- Producers: Angelo Petraglia; Jacquire King

Kings of Leon singles chronology
"Radioactive" (2010)	"Pyro" (2010)	"Back Down South" (2011)

Music video
- "Pyro" on YouTube

"Pyro" is a song by American rock band Kings of Leon, released on December 9, 2010 as the second single from their fifth studio album Come Around Sundown (2010).

The song, along with its accompanying music video, premiered on December 9 on the Kings' website and on their YouTube channel.

== Inspiration ==
According to songfacts.com, Caleb Followill explained about the original inspiration for this song: "I had actually written some verses because I was watching this piece on these radical Christians that live up in the mountains and somehow the FBI got involved and pretty much went and killed them [presumably a reference to Ruby Ridge]. And so I started writing kind of about that and about a guy that was kind of fed up with it all and he thought that the world that he was living in wasn't the perfect world to him so he kind of goes and burns it down. It's just one of those songs where it's like it starts out with someone thinking they know how it's supposed to be and at the end it's like, 'I can't even be that way.'"

== Music video ==
The music video for the song premiered on 9 December 2010. It depicts a bar fight scene and was performed by actors. The video is in slow motion. At the end of the video, everyone floats into the ceiling except for the band, who are playing as a concert band and they are playing their instruments beside the tables while sitting on chairs. Their 2004 song "Four Kicks" was set in the same studio with the same director.

== Live performances ==
Kings of Leon performed the song on Saturday Night Live on October 23, 2010.

== Track listings ==
=== Digital download ===
1. "Pyro" - 4:11

== Personnel ==
- Caleb - rhythm guitar, lead vocals
- Nathan - drums, backing vocals
- Matthew - lead guitar, Wurlitzer piano
- Jared - bass, xylophone
- Liam O'Neil - Hammond B3 organ
- Angelo Petraglia - Wurlitzer organ

== Charts ==
Chart (2011)	Peak position
Austria (Ö3 Austria Top 40)	43
Belgium (Ultratop 50 Flanders)	42
Belgium (Ultratip Bubbling Under Wallonia)	14
Germany (Media Control AG)	48
Mexico Ingles Airplay (Billboard)	21
Netherlands (Single Top 100)	58
Switzerland (Schweizer Hitparade)	74
UK Singles (Official Charts)	69
US Adult Alternative Airplay (Billboard)	13
US Alternative Airplay (Billboard)	16
US Hot Rock & Alternative Songs (Billboard)	30

== Certifications ==
Region	Certification	Certified units/sales
Australia (ARIA)	Gold	35,000^{‡}
Mexico (AMPROFON)	Platinum	60,000^{‡}
New Zealand (RMNZ)	3× Platinum	90,000^{‡}
United Kingdom (BPI)	Platinum	600,000^{‡}
^{‡} Sales+streaming figures based on certification alone.
