= My Whole World =

Single by Kings of Leon

from the album O My Beloved
- Released: September 11, 2026
- Length: 4:07
- Label: Capitol
- Songwriters: Caleb Followill; Jared Followill; Matthew Followill; Nathan Followill

Kings of Leon singles chronology
| "To Space" (2025) | "My Whole World" (2026) |

Visualizer
- "My Whole World" on YouTube

"My Whole World" is a song by American rock band Kings of Leon. It was released as the lead single from their tenth studio album O My Beloved on September 11, 2026. The song was released alongside the announcement of the album.

== Reception ==
Consequence of Sound described the song as "intimate" and "modest", with NME sharing those sentiments.

== Charts ==
Chart performance for "My Whole World"
| Chart (2026) | Peak position |
|---|---|
| Croatia International Airplay (Top lista) | 86 |
| New Zealand Hot Singles (RMNZ) | 13 |
| UK Singles Sales (Official Charts) | 96 |
| US Hot Rock & Alternative Songs (Billboard) | 39 |
