= 100,000 People =

Single by Kings of Leon

from the album When You See Yourself
- Released: January 7, 2021
- Length: 5:44
- Label: RCA
- Songwriters: Caleb Followill; Jared Followill; Matthew Followill; Nathan Followill

Kings of Leon singles chronology
"The Bandit" (2021)	"100,000 People" (2021)

Visualizer
- "100,000 People" on YouTube

"100,000 People" is a song by American rock band Kings of Leon. It was released as a digital download and for streaming on January 7, 2021, by RCA Records as the second single from their eighth studio album When You See Yourself.

== Background ==
The band teased the song on their Instagram account in January 2021. The song was written by the band and produced by Markus Dravs.

== Personnel ==
Credits adapted from Tidal.

- Markus Dravs – production
- Caleb Followill – songwriting
- Jared Followill – songwriting
- Matthew Followill – songwriting
- Nathan Followill – songwriting
- Sean Badum – engineering assistance
- Iain Berryman – engineering
- Ted Jensen – mastering
- Spike Stent – mix engineering

== Charts ==
Chart (2021)	Peak position
UK Singles Downloads (Official Charts)	68
