= List of best-selling albums of the 2000s in the United Kingdom =

List of best-selling albums of the 2000s in the United Kingdom may refer to:

- List of best-selling albums of the 2000s (century) in the United Kingdom
- List of best-selling albums of the 2000s (decade) in the United Kingdom
