= The Bandit (song) =

Single by Kings of Leon

from the album When You See Yourself
- Released: January 7, 2021
- Studio: Blackbird (Nashville)
- Genre: Post-punk revival
- Length: 4:10
- Label: RCA
- Songwriters: Caleb Followill; Jared Followill; Matthew Followill; Nathan Followill
- Producer: Markus Dravs

Kings of Leon singles chronology
"Around the World" (2017)	"The Bandit" (2021)	"100,000 People" (2021)

Music video
- "The Bandit" on YouTube

"The Bandit" is a song by American rock band Kings of Leon. It was released as a digital download and for streaming on January 7, 2021, by RCA Records as the lead single from their eighth studio album When You See Yourself. The song was nominated for Best Rock Song at the 64th Grammy Awards.

== Background ==
The band teased the song on their Instagram account on January 1, 2021. The song was written by the band and produced by Markus Dravs.

== Personnel ==
Credits adapted from Tidal.

- Markus Dravs – production
- Caleb Followill – songwriting
- Jared Followill – songwriting
- Matthew Followill – songwriting
- Nathan Followill – songwriting
- Sean Badum – engineering assistance
- Iain Berryman – engineering
- Ted Jensen – mastering
- Spike Stent – mix engineering

== Charts ==
=== Weekly charts ===
Weekly chart performance for "The Bandit"
Chart (2021)	Peak position
Belgium (Ultratip Bubbling Under Flanders)	13
Belgium (Ultratip Bubbling Under Wallonia)	26
Canada Hot Digital Songs (Billboard)	39
Canada Rock (Billboard)	3
Ireland (IRMA)	83
Mexico Ingles Airplay (Billboard)	24
New Zealand Hot Singles (RMNZ)	32
Switzerland Airplay (Schweizer Hitparade)	84
UK Singles (Official Charts)	74
US Hot Rock & Alternative Songs (Billboard)	18
US Rock & Alternative Airplay (Billboard)	6

=== Year-end charts ===
Year-end chart performance for "The Bandit"
Chart (2021)	Position
US Rock Airplay (Billboard)	22
