= When You See Yourself =

Studio album by Kings of Leon
- Released: March 5, 2021
- Recorded: 2019
- Studio: Blackbird (Nashville)
- Genre: Indie rock; post-punk revival; Southern rock
- Length: 51:26
- Label: RCA
- Producer: Markus Dravs

Kings of Leon chronology
Walls (2016)	When You See Yourself (2021)	Can We Please Have Fun (2024)

Singles from When You See Yourself
- 1. "The Bandit" / "100,000 People" Released: January 7, 2021; 2. "Echoing" Released: February 11, 2021; 3. "Stormy Weather" Released: March 5, 2021

When You See Yourself is the eighth studio album by American rock band Kings of Leon. It was released on March 5, 2021, by RCA Records. The album was produced by Markus Dravs. It was preceded by the singles "The Bandit" and "100,000 People", both released on January 7, 2021. It was the band's first album in over four years, following 2016's Walls, marking their longest gap between studio album releases as well as their final release under RCA, before becoming an independent band in 2023.

== Release and promotion ==
On March 31, 2020, the band released a live acoustic recording of its first new song in more than three years, "Going Nowhere"—later renamed "Supermarket"—through YouTube and various social media platforms.

On January 1, 2021, the band teased the song "The Bandit" on Instagram, and subsequently posted five more teasers of new songs. Six days later, the name of the album was announced and saw the release of its two lead singles: "The Bandit" and "100,000 People". The album itself was released on March 5.

The band became the first to sell a newly-released album in the form of a non-fungible token, a type of cryptocurrency that contains unique assets such as music and art. The release came in the form of three different types of tokens for three separate packages in a series called "NFT Yourself". They contained a special album package, a live show package, and an audiovisual package. The tokens were developed and hosted by YellowHeart, a ticketing platform employing blockchain technology. The album was the first NFT to be displayed at the Rock & Roll Hall of Fame.

== Critical reception ==
Professional ratings
Aggregate scores
Source	Rating
Metacritic	69/100
Review scores
Source	Rating
AllMusic	3.5/5 stars
Clash	7/10
Classic Rock	4/5 stars
The Daily Telegraph	3/5 stars
DIY	3/5 stars
musicOMH	4/5 stars
NME	4/5 stars
Pitchfork	4.8/10
Rolling Stone	3.5/5 stars
The Times	2/5 stars

When You See Yourself has received generally positive reviews from critics. On Metacritic, the album has a weighted average score of 69 out of 100 based on 19 reviews, indicating "generally favorable reviews". AllMusic's Stephen Thomas Erlewine described the album "as a continuation of Walls" in a positive review, commenting that "the moody stateliness of When You See Yourself showcases their knack for building melodrama." Robin Murray of Clash praised the record for containing the band's "most tender and honest songwriting for a decade" and giving its fans "a certain intimacy" when they listen to it, writing that, "Subtle in its evolution, Kings Of Leon treat 'When You See Yourself' as a means to re-engage with their early bite, yet remain unwilling to cede their place at rock's top table." Pitchfork contributor Evan Rytlewski wrote that: "On their eighth album, the Followill brothers desperately cling to a sound that has stopped working, trying to write songs that soar but capable only of ones that wallow." Phil Mongredien of The Guardian felt that producer Dravs couldn't make use of the band's "raw material" to get them out of performing "wearyingly featureless mellow country rock", concluding that "this is the sound of a band fresh out of ideas."

== Track listing ==
When You See Yourself track listing
No.	Title	Length
1.	"When You See Yourself, Are You Far Away"	5:47
2.	"The Bandit"	4:10
3.	"100,000 People"	5:44
4.	"Stormy Weather"	3:42
5.	"A Wave"	5:23
6.	"Golden Restless Age"	4:33
7.	"Time in Disguise"	4:45
8.	"Supermarket"	4:58
9.	"Claire & Eddie"	4:52
10.	"Echoing"	3:37
11.	"Fairytale"	3:55
Total length:		51:26

== Personnel ==
Adapted from the booklet of When You See Yourself.

Kings of Leon

- Caleb Followill – guitar, vocals
- Matthew Followill – guitar, synthesiser (on "When You See Yourself, Are You Far Away", "100,000 People" and "A Wave"), vocals
- Jared Followill – bass, acoustic guitar (on "Supermarket"), vocals
- Nathan Followill – drums, percussion, vocals

Additional musicians

- Timothy Deaux – background vocals (on "Supermarket" and "The Bandit")
- Liam O'Neil – piano, organ (on "Echoing"), mellotron (on "Fairytale"), acoustic guitar (on "Supermarket"), background vocals (on "A Wave")

Production

- Markus Dravs – production
- Iain Berryman – engineering
- Sean Badum – assistant engineer
- Mark "Spike" Stent – mixing
- Matt Wolach – assistant mix engineer
- Ted Jensen – mastering (Sterling Sound)

== Charts ==
=== Weekly charts ===
Weekly chart performance for When You See Yourself
Chart (2021)	Peak position
Australian Albums (ARIA)	1
Austrian Albums (Ö3 Austria)	1
Belgian Albums (Ultratop Flanders)	3
Belgian Albums (Ultratop Wallonia)	6
Canadian Albums (Billboard)	6
Croatian International Albums (HDU)	1
Czech Albums (ČNS IFPI)	70
Danish Albums (Hitlisten)	32
Dutch Albums (Album Top 100)	2
German Albums (Offizielle Top 100)	4
Irish Albums (OCC)	1
Italian Albums (FIMI)	32
Lithuanian Albums (AGATA)	11
New Zealand Albums (RMNZ)	2
Polish Albums (ZPAV)	7
Portuguese Albums (AFP)	2
Scottish Albums (OCC)	1
Swedish Vinyl Albums (Sverigetopplistan)	9
Swiss Albums (Schweizer Hitparade)	3
UK Albums (OCC)	1
US Billboard 200	11
US Top Alternative Albums (Billboard)	2
US Top Rock Albums (Billboard)	2

=== Year-end charts ===
Year-end chart performance for When You See Yourself
Chart (2021)	Position
US Top Rock Albums (Billboard)	95

== Certifications ==
Certifications for When You See Yourself
Region	Certification	Certified units/sales
United Kingdom (BPI)	Silver	60,000^{‡}
^{‡} Sales+streaming figures based on certification alone.
