= Come Around Sundown =

Studio album by Kings of Leon
- Released: October 15, 2010
- Recorded: February–June 2010
- Studios: Power Station (New York City); Blackbird (Nashville)
- Genre: Alternative rock
- Length: 47:26
- Label: RCA
- Producers: Jacquire King; Angelo Petraglia

Kings of Leon chronology
Only by the Night (2008)	Come Around Sundown (2010)	Mechanical Bull (2013)

Alternative cover art
- UK album cover

Singles from Come Around Sundown
- 1. "Radioactive" Released: September 14, 2010; 2. "Pyro" Released: December 9, 2010; 3. "Back Down South" Released: May 17, 2011

Come Around Sundown is the fifth studio album by American rock band Kings of Leon. It was released in Ireland, Austria and Germany on October 15, 2010, the United Kingdom on October 18 and a day later in North America, through RCA Records. The lead single "Radioactive", along with its accompanying music video, premiered on September 8 on the band's official website.

The album debuted at number one in seven countries: Australia, Austria, Belgium (Flanders), Canada, Germany, Ireland, Switzerland and the United Kingdom, and number two in the United States. In the UK, it sold 183,000 units in its first week and broke the record for biggest first-week digital album sales by selling more than 49,000 album downloads, and was the 11th-biggest-selling album of 2010 in the UK with 694,300 sales. It was nominated for Best Rock Album at the 54th Grammy Awards, while "Radioactive" was nominated for Best Rock Performance by a Duo or Group with Vocals and Best Rock Song at the previous ceremony.

== Reception ==
Professional ratings
Aggregate scores
Source	Rating
AnyDecentMusic?	6.1/10
Metacritic	64/100
Review scores
Source	Rating
AllMusic	2.5/5 stars
The A.V. Club	B+
Entertainment Weekly	B−
The Guardian	2/5 stars
Los Angeles Times	3/4 stars
NME	5/10
Pitchfork	3.6/10
Q	4/5 stars
Rolling Stone	4/5 stars
Spin	7/10

Come Around Sundown has received generally positive reviews from critics. Sampling 27 reviews, the review aggregator website Metacritic gave the album a weighted average of 64/100. Rolling Stone magazine placed Come Around Sundown at #18 on their list of the Best Albums of 2010. Q Magazine also placed the album at #25 on their lists of the 50 Best Albums of 2010. It its first week, the album sold 183,000 copies (October 2010).

== Track listing ==
=== Original release ===
All tracks are written by Kings of Leon.

No.	Title	Length
1.	"The End"	4:24
2.	"Radioactive"	3:26
3.	"Pyro"	4:10
4.	"Mary"	3:25
5.	"The Face"	3:28
6.	"The Immortals"	3:28
7.	"Back Down South"	4:01
8.	"Beach Side"	2:50
9.	"No Money"	3:05
10.	"Pony Up"	3:04
11.	"Birthday"	3:15
12.	"Mi Amigo"	4:06
13.	"Pickup Truck"	4:44
Total length:		47:26

=== Deluxe and Japanese edition ===
Bonus tracks
No.	Title	Length
14.	"Celebration"	5:03
15.	"Closer" (The Presets Remix)	4:51
16.	"Radioactive" (Remix) (featuring the West Angeles Mass Choir)	3:29

=== iTunes extended version ===
No.	Title	Length
14.	"Celebration"	5:13
15.	"Radioactive" (Remix) (feat. the West Angeles Mass Choir)	3:28
16.	"Closer" (The Presets Remix)	4:51
17.	"Radioactive" (Video)	3:26
18.	"Making of Radioactive" (Video)	3:04

== Personnel ==
Adapted from the booklet of Come Around Sundown.

Kings of Leon

- Caleb Followill – lead and backing vocals, rhythm and acoustic guitar
- Matthew Followill – lead guitar, synthesiser, piano, Wurlitzer, lap steel, backing vocals
- Jared Followill – bass, synthesiser, piano, percussion, xylophone, Omnichord, backing vocals on "Mary"
- Nathan Followill – drums, percussion, backing vocals

Additional personnel

- Jacquire King – production, percussion, backing vocals
- Angelo Petraglia – production, B3 organ, wurlitzer
- Liam O'Neil – B3 organ, baritone and tenor sax, synthesiser, piano
- Robert Mallory – fiddle
- Krish Lingala – saxophone, synthesiser, theremin
- Chris Coleman – trumpet, backing vocals
- Mike Kezner – sitar, maracas
- Ken Levitan & Andy Mendelsohn for Vector – management
- Scott Clayton, CAA (USA) & Peter Nash (Rest of World) – booking

== Charts ==
=== Weekly charts ===
Chart (2010)	Peak position
Australian Albums (ARIA)	1
Austrian Albums (Ö3 Austria)	1
Belgian Albums (Ultratop Flanders)	1
Belgian Albums (Ultratop Wallonia)	7
Canadian Albums (Billboard)	1
Danish Albums (Hitlisten)	3
Dutch Albums (Album Top 100)	2
European Albums (Billboard)	1
Finnish Albums (Suomen virallinen lista)	11
French Albums (SNEP)	27
German Albums (Offizielle Top 100)	1
Hungarian Albums (MAHASZ)	40
Irish Albums (IRMA)	1
Italian Albums (FIMI)	16
Mexican Albums (Top 100 Mexico)	9
New Zealand Albums (RMNZ)	1
Norwegian Albums (VG-lista)	3
Polish Albums (ZPAV)	1
Portuguese Albums (AFP)	3
Scottish Albums (Official Charts)	1
Spanish Albums (Promusicae)	7
Swedish Albums (Sverigetopplistan)	10
Swiss Albums (Schweizer Hitparade)	1
UK Albums (Official Charts)	1
US Billboard 200	2
US Top Alternative Albums (Billboard)	1
US Top Rock Albums (Billboard)	1
US Indie Store Album Sales (Billboard)	1

=== Year-end charts ===
Chart (2010)	Position
Australian Albums (ARIA)	16
Austrian Albums (Ö3 Austria)	21
Belgian Albums (Ultratop Flanders)	9
Canadian Albums (Billboard)	39
Dutch Albums (Album Top 100)	38
European Albums (Billboard)	55
German Albums (Offizielle Top 100)	45
Irish Albums (IRMA)	14
New Zealand Albums (RMNZ)	16
Swiss Albums (Schweizer Hitparade)	48
UK Albums (OCC)	11
US Billboard 200	97
US Top Rock Albums (Billboard)	24

Chart (2011)	Position
Australian Albums (ARIA)	67
Belgian Albums (Ultratop Flanders)	25
Belgian Albums (Ultratop Wallonia)	86
Dutch Albums (Album Top 100)	37
UK Albums (OCC)	70
US Billboard 200	93
US Top Rock Albums (Billboard)	12

=== Decade-end charts ===
Chart (2010–2019)	Position
Australian Albums (ARIA)	78
UK Albums (OCC)	57

== Certifications ==
Region	Certification	Certified units/sales
Australia (ARIA)	2× Platinum	140,000^{^}
Austria (IFPI Austria)	Platinum	20,000^{*}
Belgium (BRMA)	Gold	15,000^{*}
Canada (Music Canada)	Platinum	80,000^{^}
Denmark (IFPI Danmark)	Platinum	20,000^{‡}
Finland (Musiikkituottajat)	Gold	10,803
Germany (BVMI)	Platinum	200,000^{^}
Ireland (IRMA)	3× Platinum	45,000^{^}
Netherlands (NVPI)	Gold	25,000^{^}
New Zealand (RMNZ)	3× Platinum	45,000^{‡}
Poland (ZPAV)	Platinum	20,000^{*}
United Kingdom (BPI)	3× Platinum	915,329
United States (RIAA)	Gold	500,000^{^}
Summaries
Europe (IFPI)	Platinum	1,000,000^{*}
^{*} Sales figures based on certification alone.^{^} Shipments figures based on certification alone.^{‡} Sales+streaming figures based on certification alone.

== See also ==
- List of European number-one hits of 2010
- List of number-one hits of 2010 (Germany)
- List of number-one albums of 2010 (Ireland)
- List of number-one albums from the 2010s (Scotland)
- List of number-one albums from the 2010s (UK)
