= California Waiting =

2004 single by Kings of Leon

Single by Kings of Leon

from the album Youth & Young Manhood
- B-side: "Joe's Head" (live)
- Released: February 16, 2004
- Genre: Garage rock; Southern rock
- Length: 3:29
- Songwriters: Caleb Followill; Nathan Followill; Angelo Petraglia

Kings of Leon singles chronology
"Wasted Time" (2003)	"California Waiting" (2004)	"The Bucket" (2004)

"California Waiting" is a song by the American rock band Kings of Leon, released as the third single from their debut album Youth & Young Manhood. An alternate version of the song appears on their debut release, the EP Holy Roller Novocaine. This version was recorded in a rush to finish the record. The band did not like the outcome, so they recorded a new version, which is found on Youth and Young Manhood. However, on Kings of Leon's VH1 Storytellers performance, Caleb Followill stated, before playing "California Waiting", that "We kind of sabotaged it on our album, and tried to play it really punk rock. It was better on the EP I think."

== Track listings ==
CD single

1. "California Waiting" – 3:26
2. "Joe's Head" (live at Rock in Rio) – 3:37

10" vinyl
Released on clear vinyl in a limited edition of 5,000 copies.

1. "California Waiting"
2. "Joe's Head" (live from the Brixton Academy)

== Charts ==
Chart performance for "California Waiting"
Chart (2004)	Peak position
UK Singles (Official Charts)	61
