= King of the Rodeo =

2005 single by Kings of Leon

Single by Kings of Leon

from the album Aha Shake Heartbreak
- B-side: "Taper Jean Girl"; "Soft"
- Released: April 11, 2005
- Length: 2:25
- Label: Handmedown
- Songwriter: Kings of Leon
- Producers: Ethan Johns, Angelo Petraglia

Kings of Leon singles chronology
"Four Kicks" (2005)	"King of the Rodeo" (2005)	"On Call" (2007)

Music video
- "King of the Rodeo" on YouTube

"King of the Rodeo" is the third single taken from Kings of Leon's second album, Aha Shake Heartbreak. It was released in April 2005 and charted at number 41 on the UK Singles Chart.

== Track listings ==
All songs were written by Kings of Leon except where noted.

CD single

1. "King of the Rodeo" – 2:25
2. "Taper Jean Girl" (live in Belgium) – 3:13
3. "Molly's Chambers" (live in Belgium) (Caleb Followill, Nathan Followill, Angelo Petraglia) – 2:40
4. "King of the Rodeo" (video) – 3:10

7-inch vinyl

1. "King of the Rodeo" – 2:25
2. "Soft" – 3:02

== Covers ==
The song has been covered by the Bamboos with Megan Washington.
