= Radioactive (Kings of Leon song) =

Single by Kings of Leon

from the album Come Around Sundown
- Released: September 14, 2010
- Recorded: 2010
- Genre: Southern rock
- Length: 3:27
- Label: RCA
- Songwriters: Caleb Followill; Nathan Followill; Jared Followill; Matthew Followill
- Producers: Angelo Petraglia; Jacquire King

Kings of Leon singles chronology
"Crawl" (2009)	"Radioactive" (2010)	"Pyro" (2010)

Music video
- "Radioactive" on YouTube

"Radioactive" is a song by American rock band Kings of Leon, and was the first single released from their 2010 album Come Around Sundown.

The song, along with its accompanying music video, premiered on September 8 on the Kings' website. The following day, it received its official radio premiere on Australian radio, and debuted on US Alternative Radio on September 13. The song was released on US iTunes on September 14, and released at a later date in remaining countries.

The song was nominated for the 53rd Grammy Awards in two categories: Best Rock Performance by a Duo or Group with Vocals and Best Rock Song. The song is used in the films I Am Number Four and Boyhood.

== Music video ==
The music video was released on September 8, 2010 on the Kings of Leon's website. The video that was made in a sepia-tone refers to the band's origins, with a Southern rock sound. It shows the band at a barbecue with a gospel children's choir. Drummer Nathan Followill said, "Gospel music was a big part of us growing up, so to be able to come back and revisit that part of our lives at this stage in our lives is a pretty special thing."

NME named Radioactive's music video the second worst music video ever, commenting, "The music industry gasped in disbelief as the Oklahoma boys leapt into a muddled mise-en-scene of questionable racial subtext."

== Live performances ==
Kings of Leon performed the song on Saturday Night Live on October 23, 2010 and on Late Show with David Letterman on October 25, 2010. On November 25, 2010, the band gave a mini-concert in New York for The Today Show during which they performed a three-song set including "Radioactive". They also sang it on May 13, 2011 on VH1 Storytellers.

== Track listings ==
Digital download

1. "Radioactive" - 3:27

UK 2-track CD single

1. "Radioactive" - 3:27
2. "Radioactive (Remix Featuring West Angeles Mass Choir)" - 3:33

== Chart performance ==
"Radioactive" debuted and peaked at #37 on the Billboard Hot 100. It has since re-entered the chart at number 65 upon the release of the album. It is Kings Of Leon's 2nd highest charting song behind Use Somebody.

== Charts ==
=== Weekly charts ===
Chart (2010)	Peak position
Australia (ARIA)	19
Austria (Ö3 Austria Top 40)	36
Belgium (Ultratop 50 Flanders)	16
Belgium (Ultratop 50 Wallonia)	39
Canada Hot 100 (Billboard)	19
Denmark Airplay (Tracklisten)	15
European Hot 100 Singles	24
Germany (GfK)	41
Ireland (IRMA)	5
Japan (Japan Hot 100)	44
Japan Hot Overseas (Billboard)	10
Mexico Ingles Airplay (Billboard)	6
Netherlands (Dutch Top 40)	17
Netherlands (Single Top 100)	36
New Zealand (Recorded Music NZ)	10
Scottish Singles Sales (Official Charts)	6
Sweden (Sverigetopplistan)	53
Switzerland (Schweizer Hitparade)	69
UK Singles (Official Charts)	7
US Billboard Hot 100	37
US Adult Alternative Airplay (Billboard)	1
US Alternative Airplay (Billboard)	1
US Hot Rock & Alternative Songs (Billboard)	3

=== Year-end charts ===
Chart (2010)	Position
UK Singles (Official Charts Company)	155
US Alternative Songs (Billboard)	35
US Hot Rock Songs (Billboard)	48
Chart (2011)	Position
US Alternative Songs (Billboard)	37
US Hot Rock Songs (Billboard)	48

== Certifications ==
Region	Certification	Certified units/sales
Australia (ARIA)	Platinum	70,000^{‡}
New Zealand (RMNZ)	Platinum	30,000^{‡}
United Kingdom (BPI)	Gold	400,000^{‡}
^{‡} Sales+streaming figures based on certification alone.

== Personnel ==
- Caleb - lead and backing vocals, rhythm guitar
- Nathan - drums, percussion, backing vocals
- Matthew - lead guitar, backing vocals
- Jared - bass, percussion
- Jacquire King - percussion, backing vocals

== See also ==
- List of number-one alternative rock singles of 2010 (U.S.)
