= Wasted Time (Kings of Leon song) =

Single by Kings of Leon

from the album Youth and Young Manhood
- Released: October 20, 2003
- Recorded: 2003
- Genre: Garage rock, Southern rock
- Length: 2:45
- Label: Handmedown; CD: HMD32; 10": HMD31
- Songwriters: Nathan Followill, Caleb Followill, Angelo T. Petraglia

Kings of Leon singles chronology
"Molly's Chambers" (2003)	"Wasted Time" (2003)	"California Waiting" (2003)

Music video
- "Wasted Time" on YouTube

"Wasted Time" is a song by the American rock band Kings of Leon, released as the third single from their debut album Youth and Young Manhood. The song reached number 51 on the UK Singles Chart. The version from the Holy Roller Novocaine EP was featured on "The Boys Are Back in Town", the first episode of the second season of Entourage.

== Reception ==
A 2003 review in the News Journal described "Wasted Time" as "upbeat", highlighting "its steam-engine like percussion complete with a howling whistle in the form of some nifty guitar work".

== Track listings ==
CD single

1. "Wasted Time"
2. "Molly's Hangover"
3. "Joe's Head" (live in LA)
4. "Wasted Time" (video)

10" vinyl
Released on silver-coloured vinyl.

1. "Wasted Time" – 2:46
2. "Molly's Hangover" – 4:23
