= Aha Shake Heartbreak =

Studio album by Kings of Leon
- Released: November 1, 2004
- Recorded: April – June 2004
- Studio: Three Crows (Los Angeles)
- Genres: Alternative rock; Southern rock; garage rock revival; indie rock; stoner rock
- Length: 35:01
- Label: RCA
- Producers: Ethan Johns; Angelo Petraglia

Kings of Leon chronology
Youth & Young Manhood (2003)	Aha Shake Heartbreak (2004)	Day Old Belgian Blues (2006)

Singles from Aha Shake Heartbreak
- 1. "The Bucket" Released: October 25, 2004; 2. "Four Kicks" Released: January 10, 2005; 3. "King of the Rodeo" Released: April 11, 2005

Alternate cover
- North American and Australian editions

Aha Shake Heartbreak is the second studio album by American rock band Kings of Leon. It was first released in Europe on November 1, 2004, then in the United States on February 22, 2005, with alternate cover artwork. It is the only Kings of Leon album to carry a Parental Advisory label due to profanity in "Taper Jean Girl", "Rememo", "Soft", and "Four Kicks". The U.S. album cover is reminiscent of Queen's A Night at the Opera.

"The Bucket", "Four Kicks" and "King of the Rodeo" were released as singles in the UK.

== Recording ==
Like its predecessor, Aha Shake Heartbreak was recorded with producer Ethan Johns at his Three Crows Studio in Los Angeles using The Beatles' old Abbey Road mixing desk.

== Title and artwork ==
The title of the album comes from the third track, "Taper Jean Girl".

There were two different covers for the album: the original UK/Ireland version of the album featured a white orchid on a black background, whereas the later U.S. version featured a different kind of orchid on a white background. The releases of the album with a white orchid on the cover contain bonus track "Where Nobody Knows". On compact disc, both versions of the artwork include a picture of the band as children hidden underneath the plastic tray that holds the disc.

== Reception ==
Professional ratings
Aggregate scores
Source	Rating
Metacritic	74/100
Review scores
Source	Rating
AllMusic	3.5/5 stars
Blender	4/5 stars
Entertainment Weekly	B
The Guardian	4/5 stars
NME	8/10
Pitchfork	4.9/10
Q	4/5 stars
Rolling Stone	3.5/5 stars
Spin	B
The Village Voice	B+

At Metacritic, which assigns a weighted mean rating out of 100 to reviews from mainstream critics, the album has an average score of 74, based on 31 reviews, which indicates it received "generally favorable reviews". Rolling Stone listed it as the 39th best album of its decade, and it was also included in the book 1001 Albums You Must Hear Before You Die.

The band's popularity spiked in Australia during the weeks of September 22 and 29, 2008, when all four of their studio albums were in the top 50 on the charts. At that point, Aha Shake Heartbreak reached at its highest position yet, number 25, and attained Platinum sales. It was certified 2× Platinum in Australia on January 12, 2009.

The album has sold more than 910,000 copies worldwide.

== Track listing ==
All songs written by Kings of Leon (Caleb Followill, Nathan Followill, Jared Followill, Matthew Followill) unless otherwise noted.

No.	Title	Writer(s)	Length
1.	"Slow Night, So Long"		3:53
2.	"King of the Rodeo"		2:25
3.	"Taper Jean Girl"		3:05
4.	"Pistol of Fire"	Caleb Followill, Nathan Followill, Angelo Petraglia	2:20
5.	"Milk"		4:00
6.	"The Bucket"		2:55
7.	"Soft"	Caleb Followill, Nathan Followill, Angelo Petraglia	2:59
8.	"Razz"		2:14
9.	"Day Old Blues"		3:33
10.	"Four Kicks"		2:08
11.	"Velvet Snow"		2:10
12.	"Rememo"		3:19
Total length:			35:01

European CD edition bonus track
No.	Title	Length
13.	"Where Nobody Knows"	2:24

- "Slow Night, So Long" contains an unlisted hidden track, titled "Too Good to Tango" (1:14), within the track's total run time.

== Singles ==
- "The Bucket"
  - Released: October 25, 2004
  - Chart positions:
    #16 (UK Singles Chart)
    #23 (US Modern Rock)
    #32 (Irish Singles Chart)
- "Four Kicks"
  - Released: January 10, 2005
  - Chart positions:
    #24 (UK Singles Chart)
    #28 (Irish Singles Chart)
- "King of the Rodeo"
  - Released: April 11, 2005
  - Chart positions: #41 (UK Singles Chart)

== Personnel ==
Kings of Leon

- Caleb Followill – vocals, rhythm guitar (credited as "pipes")
- Nathan Followill – drums (credited as "skins"), backing vocals
- Jared Followill – bass (credited as "slaps"), backing vocals (4,6)
- Matthew Followill – lead guitar (credited as "licks")
- Ethan Johns – piano ("Slow Night, So Long"), keyboards ("Milk")

== Charts ==
=== Weekly charts ===
Chart (2004–2009)	Peak position
Australian Albums (ARIA)	25
Belgian Albums (Ultratop Flanders)	87
Dutch Albums (Album Top 100)	79
French Albums (SNEP)	95
German Albums (Offizielle Top 100)	39
Irish Albums (IRMA)	3
New Zealand Albums (RMNZ)	29
Scottish Albums (Official Charts)	5
UK Albums (Official Charts)	3
US Billboard 200	55

=== Year-end charts ===
Chart (2004)	Position
UK Albums (OCC)	91

Chart (2005)	Position
UK Albums (OCC)	153

Chart (2008)	Position
Australian Albums (ARIA)	81

UK Albums (OCC)	174

Chart (2009)	Position
Australian Albums (ARIA)	99
UK Albums (OCC)	143

== Certifications ==
Certifications for "Aha Shake Heartbreak"
Region	Certification	Certified units/sales
Australia (ARIA)	2× Platinum	140,000^{^}
Ireland (IRMA)	2× Platinum	30,000^{^}
New Zealand (RMNZ)	Gold	7,500^{^}
United Kingdom (BPI)	2× Platinum	600,000^{^}
^{^} Shipments figures based on certification alone.
