= Youth & Young Manhood =

Studio album by Kings of Leon
- Released: July 7, 2003
- Recorded: 2002–2003
- Studios: Shangri-La, Malibu; Sound City, Van Nuys; House of Blues, Memphis; Ocean Way, Nashville; Groundstar, Nashville
- Genres: Garage rock revival; Southern rock; stoner rock
- Length: 45:52
- Label: RCA
- Producers: Ethan Johns; Angelo Petraglia

Kings of Leon chronology
What I Saw (2003)	Youth & Young Manhood (2003)	Aha Shake Heartbreak (2004)

Singles from Youth & Young Manhood
- 1. "Molly's Chambers" Released: August 11, 2003; 2. "Wasted Time" Released: October 20, 2003; 3. "California Waiting" Released: February 16, 2004

Youth & Young Manhood is the debut album from American rock band Kings of Leon, released on July 7, 2003, in the United Kingdom and on August 19, 2003, in the United States.

== Recording and release ==
The album was recorded at Shangri-La Studios in Malibu, Sound City Studios in Van Nuys, and Ocean Way Studios in Nashville.

"Molly's Chambers", "Wasted Time", and "California Waiting" were released as singles. "Red Morning Light" was released as a promotional single. It was featured in a Ford Focus commercial and used as the opening song in the video game FIFA 2004 by EA Sports. "Spiral Staircase" was featured in the PS3 game MotorStorm. "Holy Roller Novocaine" was featured in the film Talladega Nights: The Ballad of Ricky Bobby and included on the soundtrack.

== Reception ==
Professional ratings
Aggregate scores
Source	Rating
Metacritic	79/100
Review scores
Source	Rating
AllMusic	3/5 stars
Blender	3/5 stars
Entertainment Weekly	B+
The Guardian	5/5 stars
NME	9/10
Pitchfork	4.2/10
Q	4/5 stars
Rolling Stone	4/5 stars
The Rolling Stone Album Guide	4/5 stars
Spin	B+
Uncut	5/5 stars

Critical reception for the album was generally favorable, as evidenced by its score of 79, based on 21 reviews, at Metacritic, a website that assigns a weighted mean rating out of 100 to reviews from mainstream critics. Many appreciated the band's punk- and garage rock-influenced revival of the southern rock genre, with NME hailing the album among the "best debuts of the past 10 years". AllMusic claimed the album was not "sonically adventurous", but that "in the new-millennium pop realm, some greasy licks sure sound good". James Hunter of The Village Voice called the album "2003's finest rock debut", saying the band had built on its first EP. Greg Kot wrote a favorable review in Rolling Stone, in which he declared that the band knew "when to lay back and let things simmer", as well as "when to jump up and testify with tambourines banging". At the end of the year, Rolling Stone critics named the album the tenth-best of 2003 and NME named it the seventh best. Later, it was ranked at number 80 in Rolling Stone's Top 100 Albums of the Decade list and included in the book 1001 Albums You Must Hear Before You Die.

The album peaked at number 3 in the United Kingdom, but fared worse in the band's homeland, where it peaked outside the top hundred. The band's popularity spiked in Australia during the weeks of September 22 and 29, 2008, when all four of their studio albums were in the top 50 on the charts. With this, Youth and Young Manhood made its first top 50 chart appearance since its release in 2003, peaking at number 46.

== Track listing ==
All tracks are written by Caleb Followill, Nathan Followill and Angelo Petraglia.

No.	Title	Length
1.	"Red Morning Light"	2:59
2.	"Happy Alone"	3:58
3.	"Wasted Time"	2:45
4.	"Joe's Head"	3:21
5.	"Trani"	5:00
6.	"California Waiting"	3:28
7.	"Spiral Staircase"	2:54
8.	"Molly's Chambers"	2:14
9.	"Genius"	2:48
10.	"Dusty"	4:20
11.	"Holy Roller Novocaine" (ends at 4:03; hidden track "Talihina Sky" starts at 8:20)	12:05
Total length:		45:52

== Personnel ==
- Caleb Followill – lead vocals, rhythm guitar
- Matthew Followill – lead guitar, piano on "Talihina Sky"
- Jared Followill – bass guitar, piano on "Trani"
- Nathan Followill – drums, percussion, background vocals
- Richard Causon – piano on "Joe's Head"

== Singles ==
- "Red Morning Light" (promotional single)
  - Released: May 26, 2003
- "Molly's Chambers"
  - Released: August 11, 2003
  - Chart positions: #23 (UK Singles Chart)
- "Wasted Time"
  - Released: October 20, 2003
  - Chart positions: #51 (UK Singles Chart)
- "California Waiting"
  - Released: February 16, 2004
  - Chart positions: #61 (UK Singles Chart)

== Charts and certifications ==
=== Weekly charts ===
Weekly chart performance for Youth & Young Manhood
Chart (2003–2008)	Peak position
Australian Albums (ARIA)	46
French Albums (SNEP)	97
German Albums (Offizielle Top 100)	52
Irish Albums (IRMA)	18
New Zealand Albums (RMNZ)	43
Scottish Albums (Official Charts)	4
Swedish Albums (Sverigetopplistan)	30
UK Albums (Official Charts)	3
US Billboard 200	113

=== Year-end charts ===
Year-end chart performance for Youth & Young Manhood
Chart (2003)	Position
UK Albums (OCC)	51

=== Certifications ===
Certifications and sales for Youth & Young Manhood
Region	Certification	Certified units/sales
Australia (ARIA)	3× Platinum	210,000^{^}
United Kingdom (BPI)	2× Platinum	600,000^{^}
^{*} Sales figures based on certification alone.^{^} Shipments figures based on certification alone.^{‡} Sales+streaming figures based on certification alone.

|}
