= Molly's Chambers =

Single by Kings of Leon

from the album Youth and Young Manhood
- Released: August 11, 2003
- Recorded: 2003
- Genre: Country rock
- Length: 2:15
- Label: Handmedown
- Songwriter(s): Caleb Followill; Nathan Followill; Angelo Petraglia
- Producer(s): Ethan Johns

Kings of Leon singles chronology
"Red Morning Light" (2003)	"Molly's Chambers" (2003)	"Wasted Time" (2003)

Music video
- "Molly's Chambers" on YouTube

"Molly's Chambers" is the debut single by the American alternative rock band Kings of Leon, released in 2003 from their debut album Youth and Young Manhood.

This song has an alternate take known as "Molly's Hangover", which is slower until towards the end, and features a different style of back-up vocals and guitar solos.

== Composition ==
The title is taken from a line in Thin Lizzy's version of the traditional Irish folk song "Whiskey in the Jar". "Molly's chambers" is archaic slang for a brothel.

== Track listings ==
CD digipack

1. "Molly's Chambers"
2. "Wasted Time"
3. "Spiral Staircase"

CD single

1. "Molly's Chambers"
2. "Molly's Hangover"
3. "Red Morning Light"

10" vinyl
Limited edition of 6,000 copies.

1. "Molly's Chambers" – 2:15
2. "Holy Roller Novocaine" (live at the Birmingham Academy June 27, 2003) – 3:50

== Charts ==
Chart (2003)	Peak position
Scotland (OCC)	24
UK Singles (OCC)	23
UK Rock & Metal (OCC)	3

== Certifications ==
Region	Certification	Certified units/sales
United Kingdom (BPI)	Silver	200,000^{‡}
^{‡} Sales+streaming figures based on certification alone.
