= The Bucket =

2004 single by Kings of Leon

Single by Kings of Leon

from the album Aha Shake Heartbreak
- B-side: "Where Nobody Knows"; "Slow Night, So Long"; "Wicker Chair" (live); "Trani" (live)
- Released: October 25, 2004
- Genre: Garage rock
- Length: 2:55
- Label: Handmedown
- Songwriters: Caleb Followill, Nathan Followill, Jared Followill, Matthew Followill
- Producers: Ethan Johns, Angelo Petraglia

Kings of Leon singles chronology
"California Waiting" (2003)	"The Bucket" (2004)	"Four Kicks" (2005)

Music video
- "The Bucket" on YouTube

"The Bucket" is the first single taken from the Aha Shake Heartbreak album by the American rock band Kings of Leon. It is one of the band's most successful singles, reaching number 16 in the UK Singles Chart (making it their most successful UK release at the time) and number 23 in the U.S. Modern Rock chart.

In Australia, the song was ranked number 31 on Triple J's Hottest 100 of 2004.

The song is written about bassist Jared Followill, who is the youngest member in the band, dealing with the band's fame at the age of 17. The song was written by Caleb Followill, Nathan Followill, Jared Followill and Matthew Followill. In the music video, the word "legs" (as part of "I'll swing my legs") is censored due to the line meaning to hang oneself.

In October 2011, NME placed it at number 38 on its list "150 Best Tracks of the Past 15 Years".

== Track listing ==
All songs written by Kings of Leon except where noted.

=== CD single ===
1. "The Bucket" – 2:55
2. "Where Nobody Knows" – 2:23

=== 10" vinyl ===
1. "The Bucket" – 2:55
2. "Slow Night, So Long" – 3:53
3. "Wicker Chair" (Live) (Angelo Petraglia, Caleb Followill, Nathan Followill) – 3:31
- The track "Wicker Chair" was recorded live at the Roskilde Festival on July 3, 2004 in Denmark and mixed by Brent Rawlings.

=== 7" vinyl ===
1. "The Bucket" – 2:55
2. "Trani" (Live) (Caleb Followill, Nathan Followill, Angelo Petraglia) – 5:09
- The track "Trani" was recorded live at the Bonnaroo festival on June 12, 2004 in Manchester, TN and mixed by Doug Derryberry.

=== iTunes download ===
1. "The Bucket" – 2:55
2. "Slow Night, So Long" – 3:54
3. "Wicker Chair" (Live) (Angelo Petraglia, Caleb Followill, Nathan Followill) – 3:34
- The track "Wicker Chair" was recorded live at the Roskilde Festival on July 3, 2004 in Denmark and mixed by Brent Rawlings.

== Chart performance ==
- #16 (UK)
- #23 (US Modern Rock)
- #28 (Irish Singles Chart)

== Certifications ==
Region	Certification	Certified units/sales
United Kingdom (BPI)	Gold	400,000^{‡}
^{‡} Sales+streaming figures based on certification alone.
