= Four Kicks =

2005 single by Kings of Leon

Single by Kings of Leon

from the album Aha Shake Heartbreak
- B-side: "Head to Toe", "Four Kicks" (live), "Razz" (dub mix)
- Released: January 10, 2005
- Genre: Roots rock
- Length: 2:09
- Label: Handmedown
- Songwriters: Matthew Followill, Jared Followill
- Producers: Ethan Johns, Angelo Petraglia

Kings of Leon singles chronology
"The Bucket" (2004)	"Four Kicks" (2005)	"King of the Rodeo" (2005)

Music video
- "Four Kicks" on YouTube

"Four Kicks" is the second single taken from Aha Shake Heartbreak, the second album by American rock band Kings of Leon. The song peaked at number 24 in the UK Singles Chart and number 32 in the Irish Singles Chart.

== Music video ==
The song's music video shows the band playing in a lobby where a massive fight breaks out spontaneously with people in the lobby when the band start playing the song. During the fighting the room is lit in red; but whenever Caleb is singing the red light goes out and the people fighting freeze in mid air. Christopher "Nacho" Followill, a cousin to the band and a guitar tech, makes an appearance in the video.

== Track listing ==
All songs were written by Kings of Leon and produced by Angelo Petraglia and Ethan Johns. All tracks were co-produced by Harry Smith except where noted.

CD and 7-inch vinyl

1. "Four Kicks" – 2:08
2. "Head to Toe" – 2:04
- The Special Edition CD also includes a double picture card covers, tour foldout picture booklet, radio & album versions and CD-ROM video with uncensored directors cut.

10-inch vinyl

1. "Four Kicks" – 2:08
2. "Four Kicks" (live in Belgium) – 2:41
3. "Razz" (dub mix) – 3:11
