= Angelo Petraglia =

American record producer and songwriter

Angelo Petraglia (born May 5, 1954) is an American record producer and songwriter. He was a member of the new wave band Face to Face and is best known for his work with Kings of Leon.

== Early life ==
He was born in the Bronx and grew up in Pelham, New York. His father was a janitor and his mother was a bookkeeper. By the time he'd reached the third grade, he was playing guitar, inspired by Ricky Nelson’s brief promotional appearances at the end of Ozzie and Harriet. He studied visual art at New England College.

== Songwriting career ==
Petraglia has produced albums and co-written songs with Kings of Leon. He, along with Larry Gottlieb and Kim Richey, received a Grammy nomination as the songwriters for Trisha Yearwood’s hit "Believe Me Baby (I Lied)". Petraglia also wrote and produced Patty Griffin’s song "One Big Love" for her critically acclaimed record Flaming Red (1998). "One Big Love" was later recorded by Emmylou Harris and cut on her Grammy award-winning record Red Dirt Girl (2000). He also co-wrote a song on Taylor Swift's self-titled debut album. He has written songs for Warren Zanes (Del Fuegos), Peter Wolf and Kim Richey. He has also written songs for Martina McBride, Tim McGraw, The Black Keys, Sara Evans, Lee Ann Womack, Brooks and Dunn, and Jessica Andrews.

Petraglia performs "Why Can't I Say Goodnight" with Kim Richey, a song he wrote with Richey for Nashville. The song is performed by Sam Palladio (Gunnar) and Clare Bowen (Scarlett) in the show.
