= Velvet (The Big Pink song) =

Single by The Big Pink
- Released: 20 April 2009; 15 February 2010 (re-issue)
- Recorded: The Big Pink and Miloco Garden, London
- Length: 4:15
- Label: 4AD; 2009 (AD 2915); 2010 (BAD 3X09)
- Songwriters: Milo Cordell, Robbie Furze
- Producer: The Big Pink

The Big Pink singles chronology
"Too Young to Love" (2008)	"Velvet" (2009)	"Stop the World" (2009)

The Big Pink singles chronology
"Dominos" (2009)	""Velvet" (re-issue)" (2010)	"Tonight" (2010)

Alternative cover
- Cover art for the 2010 12" vinyl re-issue

"Velvet" is the second single by The Big Pink, and their first single with the 4AD label. "Velvet" was released as a digital download and on 7-inch vinyl on April 20, 2009, and was later included on their debut album A Brief History of Love in September 2009. "Velvet" was re-issued as a single on February 15, 2010. The song was self-produced by the band, and mixed by producer Alan Moulder. The 7-inch single features the exclusive B-side "An Introduction to Awareness", while the 12-inch single features a cover version of Otis Redding's 1964 song "These Arms of Mine".

Pitchfork Media described "Velvet" as "undeniably immense, but it's a tribute to the Big Pink's skill and maturity that it still manages to sound intimate," and awarded the track a 7 out of 10 rating. In August 2009, "Velvet" was included on Pitchfork's Top 500 Tracks of the 2000s list, voted in at number 500. On Pitchfork's end-of-the-year Top 100 Tracks of 2009 list, "Velvet" was voted at #42.

A 7-minute remix of "Velvet" by Gang Gang Dance followed the original single release in May 2009 as an online-streaming single. Remixes by Mount Kimbie and Van Rivers & The Subliminal Kid (producers for Fever Ray) were also commissioned.

The song was commonly covered by Swedish artist Lykke Li during her 2011 Wounded Rhymes Tour.

== Track listing ==
7" vinyl (AD 2915) and download

1. "Velvet" – 4:15
2. "An Introduction to Awareness" – 4:22

2010 12" vinyl re-issue (BAD 3X09) and download

1. "Velvet" – 4:15
2. "Velvet" (Perversion) – 3:46
3. "These Arms of Mine" (Otis Redding cover) – 2:37

Remixes

- "Velvet" (BDG Remix by Gang Gang Dance), 6:50 – available as a free download on the band's website in May 2009, and later included on a one-sided/etched pink-and-black-coloured 12" single with limited edition vinyl pressings of A Brief History of Love in September 2009.
- "Velvet" (Mount Kimbie Remix), 3:12 – available on a 4AD promo CD-R of "Velvet" remixes, and also included on the band's Japanese EP This Is Our Time in June 2009.
- "Velvet" (Van Rivers & The Subliminal Kid Remix), 4:01 – also available on a promo CD-R of "Velvet" remixes, and as one of three exclusive bonus tracks featured on the Japanese pressing of A Brief History of Love.

== Credits ==
=== 2009 release ===
- All music and vocals by Robbie Furze and Milo Cordell.
1. "Velvet"
  - Produced by The Big Pink.
  - Lauren Jones – vocals.
  - Akiko Matsuura – drums.
  - Engineered by Jimmy Robertson.
  - Mixed by Alan Moulder at Assault and Battery.
  - Recorded at The Big Pink and at Miloco Garden, London.
2. "An Introduction to Awareness"
  - Produced and recorded by The Big Pink.
  - Mixed by Al O'Connell.
  - Recorded and mixed at The Big Pink.
- Art direction and design by Vaughan Oliver and Chris Bigg at v23.
- Photography by Marc Atkins at panoptika.net.

=== 2010 release ===
- All music and vocals by Robbie Furze and Milo Cordell.
2. "Velvet" (Perversion)
  - Performed by Milo Cordell, Robbie Furze, Akiko Matsuura, and Daniel O'Sullivan.
  - Produced, recorded, and mixed by The Big Pink.
3. "These Arms of Mine"
  - Written by Otis Redding.
  - Produced, recorded, and mixed by The Big Pink.
- Art direction and design by Edward Quarmby.
- Photography by Marc Atkins at panoptika.net.
