= Sweet Dreams (Beyoncé song) =

2009 single by Beyoncé

Single by Beyoncé

from the album I Am... Sasha Fierce
- B-side: "Ego"
- Released: June 2, 2009
- Recorded: March 2008
- Studio: South Beat Studios (Miami Beach, Florida)
- Genre: Electropop
- Length: 3:28
- Label: Columbia
- Songwriters: Beyoncé Knowles; Richard Butler Jr.; James Scheffer; Wayne Wilkins
- Producers: Beyoncé; Wayne Wilkins; Jim Jonsin; Rico Love

Beyoncé singles chronology
"Ego" (2009)	"Sweet Dreams" (2009)	"Broken-Hearted Girl" (2009)

Music video
- "Sweet Dreams" on YouTube

"Sweet Dreams" is a song by American singer Beyoncé from her third studio album I Am... Sasha Fierce (2008). Originally titled "Beautiful Nightmare", it leaked online in March 2008. The song was written and produced by Beyoncé, James Scheffer, Wayne Wilkins, and Rico Love. Columbia Records released "Sweet Dreams" as the album's sixth single, to mainstream radio and rhythmic contemporary radio playlists in the United States on June 2, 2009, and elsewhere on July 13. It is an electropop song whose instrumentation includes synthesizers, a keyboard, and a snare drum. Beyoncé employs slinky vocals to deliver the lyrics, which describe a romantic relationship that the female protagonist believes could be a dream.

Music critics praised the beats, synthpop sound and Beyoncé's vocals in "Sweet Dreams". Some critics noted that the sliding bassline gave the song a dark quality and resembled the one used in some of Michael Jackson's songs on Thriller (1982). "Sweet Dreams" gained popularity for its electronic style, which contrasted her earlier R&B, urban, and funk-tinged releases. The song was nominated for the Viewers Choice Award at the 2010 BET Awards. "Sweet Dreams" peaked at number ten on the Billboard Hot 100. Outside of the United States, "Sweet Dreams" topped the charts in New Zealand, and peaked within the top ten of the charts in many countries, including Australia, the Czech Republic, the Republic of Ireland, Slovakia, and the United Kingdom. "Sweet Dreams" was certified platinum in the United States, Australia, Canada, the United Kingdom, and New Zealand.

The song's accompanying music video was directed by Adria Petty, and was filmed in Brooklyn, New York. It mainly uses a green screen and computer-generated effects, making the clip minimal and performance based. The video sees Beyoncé wearing a golden robot suit designed by French fashion designer Thierry Mugler. Critics described it as high-fashion and noted that she reprised some of the choreography from her 2008 video for "Single Ladies". Beyoncé promoted the song by performing it live at the 2009 MTV Europe Music Awards and occasionally during the I Am... World Tour (2009–10). "Sweet Dreams" was recognized as one of the most performed songs of 2009 at the 27th American Society of Composers, Authors and Publishers (ASCAP) Pop Music Awards. The song was used in a Japanese Crystal Geyser Water advertisement that featured Beyoncé.

== Production and recording ==
Initially titled "Beautiful Nightmare", "Sweet Dreams" became one of the first songs composed for Beyoncé's 2008 double album I Am... Sasha Fierce. Record producer Rico Love regarded writing "Sweet Dreams" with Beyoncé as "the experience of a lifetime". When Beyoncé went to the South Beat Studios in Miami Beach, Florida, she was not prepared to record and had to attend the opening concert of her husband Jay-Z's tour. However, when she heard a demo of the song, she was impressed and wanted to record it immediately. She sang and recorded "Sweet Dreams" in 15 minutes.

Beyoncé, Wayne Wilkins and Jim Jonsin did additional writing and produced the song alongside Love at the same studio. Beyoncé and Love worked on the vocal arrangements; Beyoncé appreciated Love's background vocals in the hook and retained them. Jim Caruana assisted in recording the music. Love then recorded Beyoncé's vocals; the recording session lasted for an hour. Lastly, Wilkins mixed the track. "Sweet Dreams" appears on the Sasha Fierce disc of I Am... Sasha Fierce as it allowed Beyoncé to portray her alter ego Sasha Fierce, whom she described as her "fun, more sensual, more aggressive, more outspoken [...] and more glamorous side".

== Composition and lyrical interpretation ==
"Sweet Dreams"
A 20-second sample of the refrain of "Sweet Dreams", which Arielle Castillo considered to be keyboard-propelled. Beyoncé ornaments her slinky vocals with a gliding tone to settle herself back into a less tense state after moments of heightened agitation.

"Sweet Dreams" is an electropop song that incorporates elements of rock. The song is built on undulating electro rhythms and a thumping beat; its groove fits into hip hop phrasing. It is mainly driven by a keyboard and also has guitar, piano, synthesizer, snare drum and bass instrumentation. Many music critics noted that several components of "Sweet Dreams" are reminiscent of the songs on Michael Jackson's 1982 album Thriller. James Montgomery of MTV News said that the "gnarly low end" sounds like Jackson's song "Beat It" (1983). Nick Levine of Digital Spy noted that the electronic bassline is similar to those used in Jackson's songs "Thriller" (1983) and "Bad" (1987). Arielle Castillo of the Miami New Times wrote that Jackson could use the beat of "Sweet Dreams" to bring his Thriller-era style up to date.

The lyrics of "Sweet Dreams" are about a female protagonist who has insecurities about her new romantic relationship; she is confused about whether her relationship with her partner is a "sweet dream or a beautiful nightmare". The song starts with a bassline, which is occasionally interrupted by spare snare kicks, drum fills and Beyoncé's chanting, "Turn the lights on". She then adopts slinky vocals to begin the first verse. The "expansive-yet-molecular" chorus then starts with the line, "You can be a sweet dream or a beautiful nightmare / Either way, I don't wanna wake up from you". The song is written in the key of E-flat minor and has a tempo of122 beats per minute. Beyoncé's vocals span from D♭_{4} to F_{5} in the song.

== Leak and release ==
"Sweet Dreams" was leaked under its original title the day after it was recorded in March 2008, eight months before the album's release. It was the first time that a song by Beyoncé was leaked before its inclusion on an forthcoming album. She responded to the leak on her official website, thanking her fans for the positive response towards the song, before clarifying that it was a work in progress and that she did not intend to release new material in the near future. About the leak, Love told MTV News:

I was more concerned that [Beyoncé] would feel that we did it. A lot of times producers or songwriters leak records because they feel if you put the song out there it would go [on to become a hit]. Usually a leak that far in advance of an album release puts the song in serious jeopardy of being excluded from the final track list. It was frustrating. I felt like you work hard to get in the studio to work with Beyoncé. [But] I was blessed ... that song turned out [to] have nine lives.

Under the song's original title "Beautiful Nightmare", "Sweet Dreams" gained some attention in the United States, where it amassed enough airplay to chart at number forty-five on the Hot Dance Club Songs chart and at number fifty-seven on the Pop 100 Airplay chart. "Broken-Hearted Girl" was initially intended as the sixth US and fourth international single alongside the stateside-only single "Ego" (2009). However, its release was scrapped at the last minute, and replaced by "Sweet Dreams", which Beyoncé selected for release as a summer single because she wanted a dance song. She added, "It's very rare to find an uptempo song [...] that's not just about going to a club or partying or being a sexy girl".

"Sweet Dreams" was added to US contemporary hit radio and rhythmic contemporary radio playlists on June 2, 2009. Dance remixes of the song alongside the album version of "Ego" and its remixes were later released together on the same digital EP on August 17, 2009, in the US.

== Critical reception ==
=== Reviews ===
"Sweet Dreams" was acclaimed by critics, some of whom praised its dark tone and electropop sound that differed from Beyoncé's previous work. James Montgomery of MTV News wrote that Beyoncé's vocals, which he called "icy and cool, slippery like mercury [and] nothing to scoff at either", help make the song an "undeniable smash" that is unique compared to the work of other artists. Jennifer Vineyard of the same publication argued that the rock elements and smooth vocals contribute to Beyoncé's "fierce" alter ego, who "dares the listener to dream of her, warning that it might be a 'beautiful nightmare'." Arielle Castillo of the Miami New Times noted that "Sweet Dreams" is another one of Jim Jonsin's productions with a keyboard-propelled arrangement, but unlike the material Jonsin crafted for Soulja Boy, the song is "swirling, and darker". Joey Guerra of the Houston Chronicle and Gary Trust of Billboard magazine agreed and said the song is one of Beyoncé's purest dance songs and is "an irresistible call to the dance floor". Describing "Sweet Dreams" as a "cool dance track", Dennis Amith of J!-ENT complimented its arrangement, calling it "experimental" with "cool transitions".

Adam Mazmanian of The Washington Times described the song as "a gritty slow grind with a salacious bassline" and noted that Beyoncé "delivers a near parody of a good-girl voice" while singing the chorus. Ryan Dombal of Pitchfork Media wrote that "Sweet Dreams" sounds like a song Rihanna would sing. Echoing Dombal's sentiments, Nick Levine of Digital Spy wrote that the best song on the Sasha Fierce disc is a "dark[ish] electropop track called 'Sweet Dreams', [which] actually sounds like the cousin of Rihanna's 'Disturbia'". On a separate review for the single, Levine awarded "Sweet Dreams" a rating of four stars out of five, and commented that the song seduces listeners with its catchy chorus hook, and thereafter keeps them intrigued by "placing a hint of darkness just beneath the shiny, synthy surface". Spence D. of IGN Music wrote that though "Sweet Dreams" is not a "stellar track", it is superior to other album tracks, including "Diva" and "Radio". Similarly, Vicki Lutas of BBC Music wrote that even though "Sweet Dreams" appears to lack something, it is undeniably a good song overall. She added that "Sweet Dreams" may not be Beyoncé's finest or most memorable work, but it remains her best offering since her 2003 song "Crazy in Love". Lutas also commended Beyoncé's vocal delivery, which she described as "beautiful and soft, yet strong and powerful". Talia Kraines of the same publication wrote that "Sweet Dreams" is one of the standout tracks on the Sasha Fierce disc though she believed Beyoncé did not get as experimental as she did on her 2006 song "Ring the Alarm".

=== Recognition and accolades ===
"Sweet Dreams" earned Beyoncé the Best Female Vocal accolade at the 2009 Music MP3 Awards. It was nominated for Best R&B/Urban Dance Track at the 25th Annual International Dance Music Awards, but lost to the Black Eyed Peas' 2009 song "I Gotta Feeling". It was also nominated for the Viewers Choice Award at the 2010 BET Awards. The American Society of Composers, Authors and Publishers (ASCAP) recognized "Sweet Dreams" as one of the most performed songs of 2009 at the 27th ASCAP Pop Music Awards. On the occasion of Beyoncé's thirtieth birthday, Erika Ramirez and Jason Lipshutz of Billboard magazine ranked the song at number 21 on their list of Beyoncé's 30 biggest Billboard hits, and noted that its electropop sound, which was in contrast to Beyoncé's previous singles, showcased her range of talent. On The Village Voice's 2009 Pazz & Jop singles list, "Sweet Dreams" was ranked at number 115. In 2013, John Boone and Jennifer Cady of E! Online placed the song at number five on their list of ten best Beyoncé songs, writing that Beyoncé "stepped away from R&B roots with this surreal electropop tune, which features these standout lyrics: 'My guilty pleasure, I ain't going nowhere / As long as you're here, I'll be floating on air' (which, from Bey's mouth, sounds like the greatest threat ever)".

== Chart performance ==
"Sweet Dreams" debuted at number 97 on the US Billboard Hot 100 chart issue dated August 8, 2009. It peaked at number ten for two non-consecutive weeks on the charts dated November 7 and 21, 2009, and become her fourth top 10 single from the album. The song became Beyoncé's thirteenth top ten Hot 100 single as a solo artist during the 2000s, and tied her with Ludacris and T-Pain for second-most top tens on the chart since 2000; Beyoncé's husband Jay-Z led with fourteen in that period. "Sweet Dreams" is the third song with the title to reach the top ten of the Hot 100 chart, following "Sweet Dreams" by Air Supply in 1982 and "Sweet Dreams (Are Made of This)" by Eurythmics in 1983. For the week ending September 12, 2009, it topped the US Hot Dance Club Songs chart; it became Beyoncé's eleventh number-one song, and was the fourth song from I Am... Sasha Fierce to top that chart. "Sweet Dreams" tied Beyoncé with Kristine W for second-most number-one songs on the Hot Dance Club Songs during the 2000s. "Sweet Dreams" was certified platinum by the Recording Industry Association of America (RIAA), denoting sales of one million digital copies. As of October 2012, it had sold 1,691,000 digital downloads in the US.

In the United Kingdom, "Sweet Dreams" debuted at number 52 on the UK Singles Chart on July 18, 2009. It peaked at number five on the UK Singles Chart on August 9, 2009, where it remained for three consecutive weeks, and became Beyoncé's eighth top ten single in Britain as a solo artist. In Australia, the song peaked at number two on the ARIA Singles Chart on August 9, 2009. The song spent 38 consecutive weeks on the ARIA Singles Chart, and last charted on March 1, 2010; it was certified 4× platinum by the Australian Recording Industry Association (ARIA) in 2023, for 280,000 equivalent units.

Outside of the United Kingdom, "Sweet Dreams" met with some success across Europe, less however than previous "I Am... Sasha Fierce" singles. Thus, the track reached the top ten in Germany, Czech Republic, Norway, Slovakia, Spain, Portugal and Hungary, top twenty in Sweden, Denmark, Switzerland, Austria and Russia, top thirty in Belgium, and Italy, and top fifty in the Netherlands. In France, the song did not enter in the country's official music charts but entered both the French Singles Download Chart and the French Airplay Chart, at number 30 and number 2, respectively. It is the third single from I Am... Sasha Fierce that did not enter the charts in France at the time of its release.

== Music video ==
=== Background and concept ===
The golden robotic suit that Beyoncé wears in the music video (pictured) was designed by Thierry Mugler

The accompanying music video for "Sweet Dreams" was directed by Adria Petty, whom Beyoncé chose because of her intelligence and visual references. After Beyoncé learned the choreography in Los Angeles, the video was shot in a studio in Brooklyn, New York City. It was the seventh video from the album, and the second to have complete color, with "Halo" being the first. Beyoncé described it as more "graphic" when compared to the previous six videos, and commented it took "Sasha [Fierce] to the next level". In the video, Fierce is symbolized by the golden robotic suit she wears; it was designed by French fashion designer Thierry Mugler.

A green screen and computer-generated imagery (CGI) were used for the video to create a minimal and performance-based clip. The CGI was employed to create a contextless void, as the background was deleted and a void-like digital canvas was created for the dance routine that is executed by Beyoncé and her dancers Saidah Nairobi and Ashley Everett, who all sport numerous flashy, symmetrical costumes throughout the video. Accordingly, there were no concerns of cutting as the images were merged into one another using computers. A high number of camera lens glare effects were used in the video, part of which was inspired by British designer Gareth Pugh's Autumn/Winter 2009 video presentation. Beyoncé further commented about the fashion and choreography:

The fashion was extremely important in this video because everything was so minimal ... With the choreography, we really focused on hitting all of the accents in the drum beat. What makes this choreography so interesting is that in one instance, it is very staccato and hard... And the next instance; the movement is very smooth and there are lots of melts with intricate movement in the fingers and hands.

On June 12, 2009, a behind-the-scenes video of Beyoncé's dance rehearsal was released; Beyoncé was dressed in golden costumes and was performing some robotic movements. A 30-second clip from the video was posted online on July 8, 2009; it showed Beyoncé alongside her two female backup dancers in a virtual desert. The following day, the full video was leaked online but was soon deleted after Beyoncé's label issued warnings to infringing websites. The video for "Sweet Dreams" premiered on MTV later the same day.

=== Synopsis and analysis ===
The video opens with Beyoncé tossing and turning in her bed; she said her idea was to make the opening shot look like "a dark fairy tale". As she tries to sleep, Johannes Brahms' "Wiegenlied" plays softly in the background. She then levitates off her bed using her stomach muscles to move the top half of her body. Beyoncé said that the levitation shot was the hardest one as she had difficulty making her neck look straight. She added that the scene represents the nightmare and a white bird flying above her takes her into her dream, which unfolds after the screech of an electric guitar. Beyoncé is transported to a desert and several clouds are present in the background. She wears a black Roberto Cavalli dress and boots; as the music begins, her two backup dancers wearing Gareth Pugh pieces appear. The scene changes into a computer-generated sci-fi landscape where Beyoncé is inscribed with a circle and square in a manner similar to Leonardo da Vinci's Vitruvian Man. The first chorus is brought in by a subtle glass-breaking sound effect as the sci-fi special effects disappear and Beyoncé appears in a silver one-shouldered mini dress on a white background. Accompanied by her backup dancers, she performs dance moves described as "sophisticated", "street", and "hip-busting".

The second chorus shows Beyoncé wearing a silver-lined bodysuit while smashing mirrors. During the bridge, the video fades to black and white and Beyoncé appears wearing the gold robot suit, and gold and diamond nail rings valued at $US36,000 and designed by Jules Kim. While wearing it, she executes robotic movements. As the chorus plays for the third and final time, digital doubling and mirroring are used to create a collection of dance moves and multiple images of Beyoncé arching her back. The gold outfit is then reused, this time in color. Beyoncé performs another dance routine with her two backup dancers, then says, "Turn the lights out", and the video ends.

=== Reception ===
James Montgomery of MTV News wrote that the video is "an eye-popping, herky-jerky, high-fashion" one. He praised the way Beyoncé "[pops] her pelvis in ways never imagined", and the wardrobe changes in the clip, before concluding: "She expands on her burgeoning robot fetish, flashes the crazy eyes and contorts her body in downright unsettling ways. All of which is to say that 'Sweet Dreams' is just like every amazingly crazy Beyoncé video from the past three years, which — to extend the point — also means that it's pretty great." Olivia Smith of Daily News noted that in the video, Beyoncé references Jane Fonda in the movie Barbarella (1968), the Tin Woodman and Pamela Anderson through the different costumes she wears. Smith further compared the video with the video for "Single Ladies (Put a Ring on It)", writing that Beyoncé reprises some of the moves she performed there. Brandon Soderberg of Slant Magazine described the introductory part of the video as a David Lynch-like mixture of eroticism and symbolism. He added that the video was "one part Victoria's Secret commercial, another part dream logic anti-narrative, and a CGI-assisted freakout all around", and commended the video for being "an excess of body and action, not filmic techniques", adding that the dancing in the video "blow[s] our minds anew".

Rolling Stone found similarities between the video for "Sweet Dreams", Kanye West's video for "Paranoid" (2009) and the cover artworks of the English rock band Yes. Canadian magazine Dose also compared the video with "Paranoid" due to their similar dream sequences. Vicki Lutas of BBC did not appreciate the first 30 seconds of the video, writing that "the dark, horror-type music, the pumping heartbeat, the equally spooky lullaby, the screech of an electric guitar", gave her the impression that she was watching "some [19]80s magician, with a Beyoncé soundtrack". However, she complimented the rest of the video writing that "things (thankfully) move away from the Hallowe'en cheese and into familiar Beyoncé territory (right from the fact it's proper [19]80s pop through to the video essentially being 'Single Ladies' with Beyoncé and 2 dancers)". Lutas concluded that the video might not be remembered for long or hailed as Beyoncé's finest and most memorable work, but it remains one of the best music videos by Beyoncé she has seen since "Crazy in Love". Nick Levine of Digital Spy compared the dancing moves in the video with those in "Single Ladies".

It was ranked at number 13 on BET's Notarized: Top 100 Videos of 2009 countdown. Tamar Anitai of MTV placed the video at number three on his list of the best five videos of 2009 and wrote that it "isn't just another high-fashion look at Beyoncé", and continuing, "It's the dark yin to the brighter, lighter fare of 'Single Ladies.' This is a 360-degree look at Beyoncé's life: Beyoncé the woman, Sasha Fierce the performer, and the powerful force that occupies the spaces in between." In 2013, John Boone and Jennifer Cady of E! Online placed the video at number ten on their list of Beyoncé's ten best music videos, praising Beyoncé's sexy robotic look.

== Promotion ==
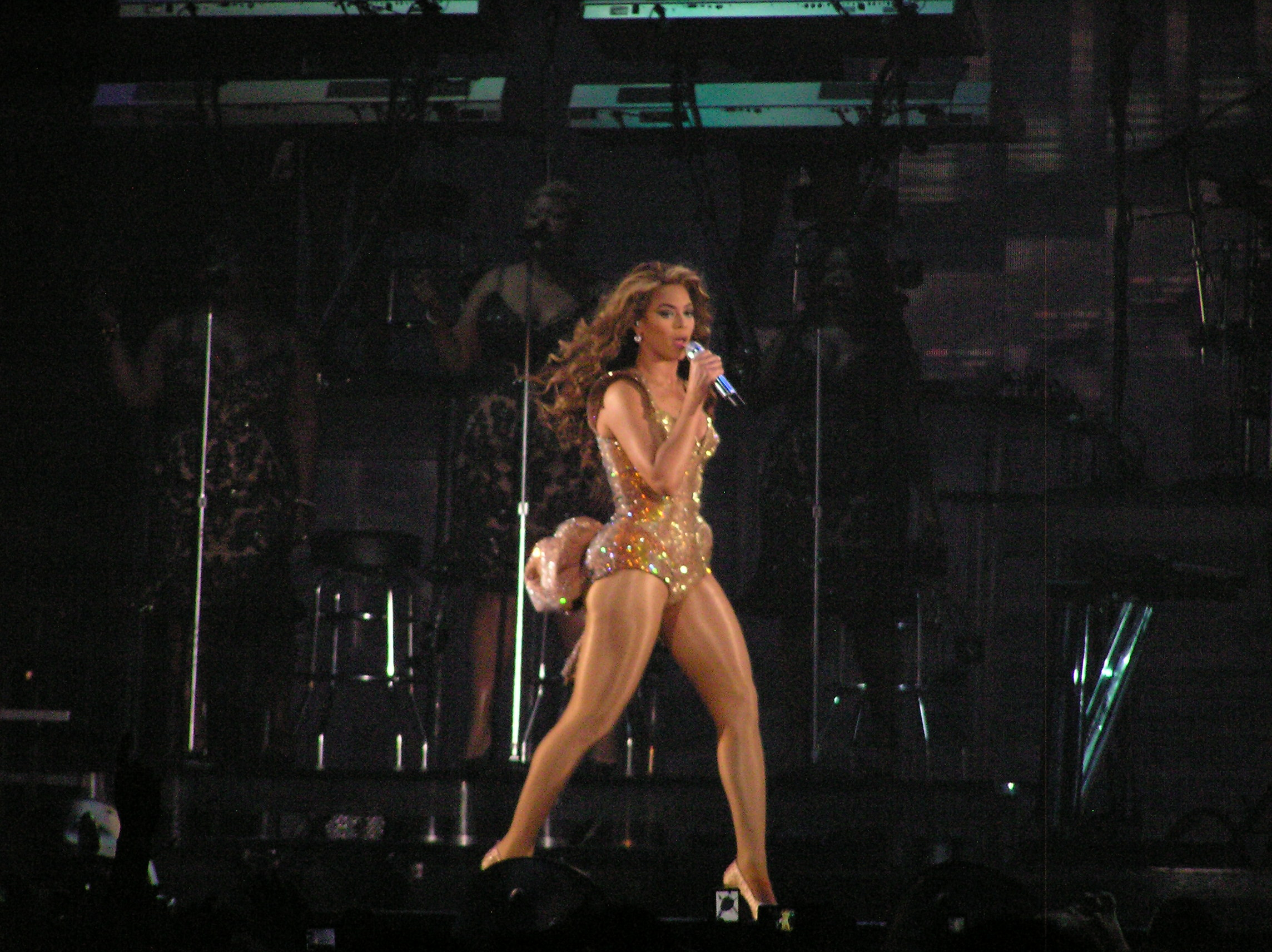
Beyoncé performing "Sweet Dreams" during her I Am... World Tour.

Beyoncé was due to perform "Sweet Dreams" at the 2009 MTV Video Music Awards on September 13. However, last-minute changes were brought to her performance that night; wearing a leotard and a silver glove, Beyoncé sang a short drum-led remix of "Sweet Dreams" before switching to "Single Ladies", accompanied by two female backup dancers. Wearing a red Agent Provocateur corset, stockings and long satin gloves, Beyoncé sang "Sweet Dreams" at the 2009 MTV Europe Music Awards on November 5. Charly Wilder of Spin magazine commented that Beyoncé overshadowed American singer Katy Perry (host of the event) "with her mesmerizing, sexed-up rendition" of "Sweet Dreams".

"Sweet Dreams" was not regularly performed on the I Am... World Tour, a 2009–10 world tour in support of I Am... Sasha Fierce, but a video interlude featuring the song was included. Beyoncé sang an acoustic and downtempo rendition of the song live during the concert residency I Am... Yours that was held at the Encore Theater in Las Vegas on August 2, 2009. She blended it into a romantic medley that also included her 2003 song "Dangerously in Love 2" and Anita Baker's 1986 song "Sweet Love". The performance was subsequently included on her 2009 CD/DVD live album I Am... Yours: An Intimate Performance at Wynn Las Vegas. Beyoncé performed "Sweet Dreams" live at her historic headlining Glastonbury Festival performance on June 26, 2011; she mixed it with "Sweet Dreams (Are Made of This)" by Eurythmics. In 2023, portions of "Sweet Dreams" were included in the performance of "Alien Superstar" during the Renaissance World Tour.

"Sweet Dreams" was used in a commercial for Crystal Geyser bottled water, in which Beyoncé appeared; she dances and drinks water while the song is played in the background.

== Cover versions ==
An unofficial remix of "Sweet Dreams", featuring American rappers Lil Wayne and Nicki Minaj, was included on Wayne's 2009 mixtape No Ceilings. English electro-rock duo the Big Pink covered the song in a live session for BBC Radio 1 on November 7, 2009. They also performed it at the 2010 Isle of Wight Festival on June 13, 2010. The cover later became the B-side to their 2010 single "Tonight". Jon Caramanica of The New York Times commented that their version had a "disarmingly flat affect, delivering it as the ramble of a neurotic" when compared to the original. Likewise, Pitchfork's Ryan Dombal felt that their cover "obliterates the original's Hi-NRG pulse, turning it into something a lot moodier and creepier".

On November 1, 2010, American professional basketball player, Shaquille O'Neal, dressed as his female alter ego Shaquita for Halloween, and gave a lip-synching performance of Beyoncé's "Sweet Dreams". In September 2011, Jade Collins covered "Sweet Dreams" during an episode of the ninth series of The X Factor. On October 27, 2012, boy band Union J covered the song during the same season of the show.

=== Jessica Sanchez version ===
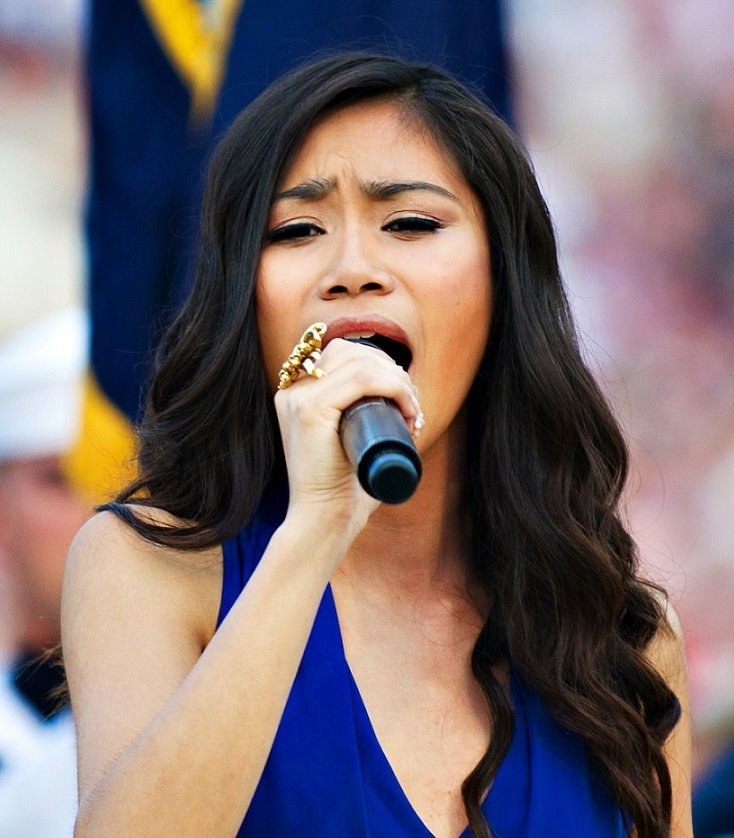
Sanchez in 2012, the same year she covered "Sweet Dreams" for American Idol

On March 28, 2012, Jessica Sanchez, a contestant of the eleventh season of American Idol, covered "Sweet Dreams" performing a slow-tempo ballad version of the song accompanied at the beginning by harps. The performance received favorable comments and a standing ovation from the judges of the show. Jennifer Lopez praised the rendition, stating that it reimagined the song in a way that even Beyoncé might consider incorporating into her own performances Steven Tyler described the performance as strong, while Randy Jackson called it sensational. James Montgomery of MTV News graded her performance a B, describing it as an unconventional yet confident song choice. He added, "For once, she pulled things back, and maybe suffered a bit for doing so, but there were still plenty of subtly great moments, particularly in the verses. Might not have been her best—it definitely lacked in vocal fireworks ... And really, it was good enough".

Mellisa Locker of Rolling Stone praised Sanchez's performance, describing it as a strong and confident rendition that successfully took a creative risk. She suggested that, much like Beyoncé herself, Sanchez was capable of delivering a compelling reinterpretation, and likened the performance to the dream sequence from the 1945 film Spellbound, albeit in a slightly more surreal form. Jim Farber of the Daily News offered a more critical assessment, arguing that Sanchez’s interpretation bore excessive similarity to Beyoncé’s vocal timbre and phrasing, which he felt diminished the individuality of her voice, despite her reworking of the song’s arrangement. Amy Reiter of the Los Angeles Times wrote that Sanchez delivered a precisely calibrated performance that balanced restraint with power, noting that her vocals, styling, and staging appeared polished and tour-ready. The Hollywood Reporter's Erin Carlson commended the subdued theatrical staging and Sanchez’s controlled vibrato, characterizing the performance as nearly flawless.

== Formats and track listings ==
- "Ego / Sweet Dreams (Singles & Dance Mixes)"
1. "Ego" – 3:57
2. "Ego" (DJ Escape & Johnny Vicious Club Remix) – 8:22
3. "Ego" (Slang "Big Ego" Club Remix) – 6:18
4. "Sweet Dreams" – 3:28
5. "Sweet Dreams" (OK DAC Club Remix) – 5:14
6. "Sweet Dreams" (Karmatronic Club Remix) – 6:36
- Germany digital EP
1. "Sweet Dreams" – 3:28
2. "Sweet Dreams" (Groove Police Remix – Radio Edit) – 3:10
3. "Ego" – 3:57
4. "Ego" (Remix) [feat. Kanye West] – 4:43
5. "Sweet Dreams" (Video) – 4:00
6. "Ego" (Remix) [feat. Kanye West] (Video) – 4:52
- Digital EP
1. "Sweet Dreams" (Dave Spoon Remix) – 7:07
2. "Sweet Dreams" (Steve Pitron & Max Sanna Remix – Radio Edit) – 3:37
3. "Sweet Dreams" (Steve Pitron & Max Sanna Club Remix) – 7:38
4. "Sweet Dreams" (Oli Collins & Fred Portelli Remix) – 5:38
5. "Sweet Dreams" – 3:28
- Digital single; Germany and UK CD single
1. "Sweet Dreams" – 3:28
2. "Sweet Dreams" (Steve Pitron & Max Sanna Remix) [Radio Edit] – 3:35

== Credits and personnel ==
Credits are taken from I Am... Sasha Fierce liner notes.

- Beyoncé Knowles – lead vocals, music producer, songwriter
- Rico Love – vocal producer, music producer, songwriter, additional vocals
- Jim Caruana – recording engineer
- James Scheffer – music producer, songwriter
- Wayne Wilkins – songwriter, audio mixer, music producer

== Charts ==
=== Weekly charts ===
Chart (2009–2011)	Peak position
Australia (ARIA)	2
Australia Urban (ARIA)	1
Austria (Ö3 Austria Top 40)	17
Belgium (Ultratop 50 Flanders)	24
Belgium (Ultratip Bubbling Under Wallonia)	4
Brazil (Hot 100 Airplay)	2
Canada (Canadian Hot 100)	17
Canada CHR/Top 40 (Billboard)	10
Canada Hot AC (Billboard)	11
CIS Airplay (TopHit)	19
Croatia International Airplay (HRT)	2
Czech Republic (Rádio Top 100)	5
Denmark (Tracklisten)	16
Euro Digital Song Sales (Billboard)	4
France (SNEP) Download Chart	30
France Airplay (SNEP)	2
Germany (Official German Charts)	8
Global Dance Tracks (Billboard)	10
Hungary (Rádiós Top 40)	7
Hungary (Single Top 40)	7
Ireland (IRMA)	4
Italy Airplay (EarOne)	30
Italy Sales (FIMI)	25
Japan Hot 100 (Billboard)	30
Mexico (Billboard Ingles Airplay)	41
Netherlands (Dutch Top 40)	26
Netherlands (Single Top 100)	46
New Zealand (Recorded Music NZ)	1
Norway (VG-lista)	6
Russia Airplay (TopHit)	15
Scottish Singles Sales (Official Charts)	5
Slovakia Airplay (ČNS IFPI)	5
Spain (Promusicae)	9
Sweden (Sverigetopplistan)	14
Switzerland (Schweizer Hitparade)	16
UK Singles (Official Charts)	5
UK Hip Hop/R&B (Official Charts)	3
US Billboard Hot 100	10
US Adult Contemporary (Billboard)	25
US Adult Pop Airplay (Billboard)	29
US Dance Club Songs (Billboard)	1
US Hot R&B/Hip-Hop Songs (Billboard)	48
US Pop Airplay (Billboard)	5
US Rhythmic Airplay (Billboard)	1

=== Year-end charts ===
Chart (2009)	Position
Australia (ARIA)	23
Australia Urban (ARIA)	7
Austria (Ö3 Austria Top 40)	64
Brazil (Crowley)	94
Canada (Canadian Hot 100)	82
CIS (TopHit)	69
Croatia International Airplay (HRT)	32
European Hot 100 Singles (Billboard)	86
Germany (Official German Charts)	40
Hungary (Rádiós Top 100)	46
Ireland (IRMA)	45
New Zealand (Recorded Music NZ)	9
Norway (VG-lista)	33
Russia Airplay (TopHit)	64
Sweden (Sverigetopplistan)	65
Switzerland (Swiss Hitparade)	90
UK Singles (OCC)	39
US Billboard Hot 100	66
US Dance Club Songs (Billboard)	11
US Radio Songs (Billboard)	53

Chart (2010)	Position
CIS (TopHit)	167
Hungary (Rádiós Top 100)	21
Russia Airplay (TopHit)	83
Spain (PROMUSICAE)	49
US Billboard Hot 100	86
US Radio Songs (Billboard)	64
US Rhythmic (Billboard)	43

2011 year-end chart performance for "Sweet Dreams"
Chart (2011)	Position
Russia Airplay (TopHit)	176

== Certifications ==
Region	Certification	Certified units/sales
Australia (ARIA)	4× Platinum	280,000^{‡}
Canada (Music Canada)	Platinum	80,000^{‡}
Denmark (IFPI Danmark)	Platinum	90,000^{‡}
Germany (BVMI)	Gold	150,000^{‡}
New Zealand (RMNZ)	3× Platinum	90,000^{‡}
United Kingdom (BPI)	2× Platinum	1,200,000^{‡}
United States (RIAA)	3× Platinum	3,000,000^{‡}
^{‡} Sales+streaming figures based on certification alone.

== Release history ==
Release dates and formats for "Sweet Dreams"
Region	Date	Format(s)	Label(s)	Ref.
United States	June 2, 2009	Contemporary hit radio; rhythmic contemporary radio	Columbia	
Brazil	July 1, 2009	Digital download (EP)	Sony Music	
France	July 17, 2009	Digital download	Sony Music	
Germany	July 17, 2009	Digital download	Sony Music	
United States	July 21, 2009	Digital download (EP) (Note: In the United States, "Sweet Dreams" was released as a double A-side single with "Ego" on the digital EP.)	Columbia; Music World	
Italy	July 23, 2009	Contemporary hit radio	Sony Music	
Australia	July 27, 2009	Maxi CD	Sony Music	
Germany	July 31, 2009	CD; digital download (EP)	Sony Music	
United Kingdom	August 10, 2009	CD	RCA	

== See also ==
- List of Billboard Hot Dance Club Play number ones of 2009
- List of Billboard Rhythmic number-one songs of the 2000s
- List of number-one singles from the 2000s (New Zealand)
