= Above and Beyoncé: Video Collection & Dance Mixes =

2009 music video and remix album by Beyoncé

Remix album / video by Beyoncé
- Released: June 16, 2009
- Recorded: 2008–2009
- Genres: Dance; electronica; R&B
- Length: 51:10 (Video Collection); 50:04 (Dance Mixes)
- Labels: Columbia; Music World
- Directors: Jake Nava; Beyoncé Knowles; Sophie Muller; Melina Matsoukas; Philip Andelman; Ed Burke
- Producers: Beyoncé Knowles; Toby Gad; Tricky Stewart; The-Dream; Bangladesh; Sean Garrett; Ryan Tedder; Stargate; Blac Elvis; Harold Lilly; Jim Jonsin; Wayne Wilkins; Rico Love; Maurice Joshua; DJ Escape; Tony Coluccio; Achilles Sparta; Péter Krajczár; Dave Audé; James Cruz; OK DAC; Harlan Pepper & AG III

Beyoncé chronology
| I Am... Sasha Fierce (2008) | Above and Beyoncé: Video Collection & Dance Mixes (2009) | I Am... Yours: An Intimate Performance at Wynn Las Vegas (2009) |

Beyoncé video chronology
| The Beyoncé Experience Live (2007) | Above and Beyoncé: Video Collection & Dance Mixes (2009) | I Am... Yours: An Intimate Performance at Wynn Las Vegas (2009) |

Above and Beyoncé: Video Collection & Dance Mixes is a remix and video album by American singer-songwriter Beyoncé. It was released on June 16, 2009, by Columbia Records and Music World Entertainment. Consisting of two discs, the album features music videos and dance remixes of singles from her third studio album I Am... Sasha Fierce (2008).

Above and Beyoncé: Video Collection & Dance Mixes peaked at number thirty-five on the US Billboard 200, and received generally favorable reviews from music critics. It also appeared on US Billboard's component charts, Top R&B/Hip-Hop Albums and Dance/Electronic Albums. The remix version of "Ego" included on the album, featuring Kanye West, was nominated for Grammy Award for Best Rap/Sung Collaboration at the 52nd Annual Grammy Awards (2010).

== Background and content ==
Above and Beyoncé comprises two discs. The first contains the music videos of six of the singles from her 2008 studio album, I Am... Sasha Fierce: "If I Were a Boy", "Single Ladies (Put a Ring on It)", "Diva", "Halo", Broken-Hearted Girl" and "Ego". It also features a "fan exclusive" cut of the "Ego" video and behind-the-scenes footage of the shooting of the videos. The second disc hosts electronica dance remixes of the songs, as well as of the album's sixth single, "Sweet Dreams". A mix of "Ego" with a rap verse from Kanye West closes the album.

== Release and artwork ==
On June 15, 2009, the behind-the-scenes footage was broadcast on BET's Access Granted. The remix video for "Ego" premiered afterwards. The cover art of Above and Beyoncé was previewed by People magazine in May 2009. The album was originally released exclusively to Walmart and J&R, on June 16, 2009. The dance mixes only were made available via MP3 format through Amazon Music the same day, and the whole album was released to the online store on November 3, 2009. The iTunes Store began selling the remixes on February 1, 2010.

== Critical reception ==
Professional ratings
Review scores
| Source | Rating |
|---|---|
| AllMusic | 3/5 stars |

AllMusic's Andy Kellman called the album "a nice set for devoted fans who haven't already shelled out for all the mixes", and awarded it three out of five stars. In 2011, Maura Gavaghan, writing for MTV, said: "The creative title of this video album alone is a reason for every devoted fan... to buy a copy". She added that the dance remixes of the songs make a "dance party in a neatly packaged DVD set".

== Commercial performance ==
Above and Beyoncé: Video Collection & Dance Mixes debuted at number thirty-six on the US Billboard 200 chart dated July 4, 2009, selling 14,000 copies that week. It later peaked at number thirty-five, spending fourteen weeks on the chart. On the US Top R&B/Hip-Hop Albums, Above and Beyoncé: Video Collection & Dance Mixes debuted and peaked at number twenty-three, spending forty-three weeks on the chart. Among the US Dance/Electronic Albums, the album debuted at number two, placing below Lady Gaga's debut studio album The Fame (2008). It spent a total of forty-eight weeks on the chart, including twenty-four weeks in the top ten. Above and Beyoncé: Video Collection & Dance Mixes was ranked at number nine on the year-end US Dance/Electronic Albums for 2009, and at number twenty-one for 2010.

== Track listing ==
=== Video Collection ===
Disc one
| No. | Title | Writer(s) | Director(s) | Length |
|---|---|---|---|---|
| 1. | "If I Were a Boy" | Toby Gad; BC Jean | Jake Nava | 5:06 |
| 2. | "Single Ladies (Put a Ring on It)" | Tricky Stewart; The-Dream; Kuk Harrell; Beyoncé Knowles | Nava | 3:19 |
| 3. | "Diva" | Knowles; Bangladesh; Sean Garrett | Melina Matsoukas | 4:06 |
| 4. | "Halo" | Knowles; Ryan Tedder; E. Kidd Bogart | Philip Andelman | 3:45 |
| 5. | "Broken-Hearted Girl" | Babyface; Mikkel Eriksen; Tor Erik Hermansen; Knowles | Sophie Muller | 4:40 |
| 6. | "Ego" (Remix featuring Kanye West) | Blac Elvis; Harold Lilly; Knowles | Knowles; Frank Gatson Jr. | 4:53 |
| 7. | "Ego" (Fan exclusive) | Williams; Lilly; Knowles | Knowles; Gatson Jr. | 3:57 |
| 8. | "Behind the Scenes: the Videos" | | Ed Burke | 19:02 |

=== Dance Mixes ===
Disc two
| No. | Title | Writer(s) | Producer(s) | Length |
|---|---|---|---|---|
| 1. | "If I Were a Boy" (Maurice Joshua Mojo UK Remix) | Gad; Jean | Gad; Knowles; Joshua^{[a]} | 6:29 |
| 2. | "Single Ladies (Put a Ring on It)" (DJ Escape & Tony Coluccio Remix – Club Version) | Stewart; The-Dream; Harrell; Knowles | Stewart; The-Dream; Knowles; DJ Escape^{[a]}; Tony Coluccio^{[a]} | 6:57 |
| 3. | "Diva" (Karmatronic Club Remix) | Knowles; Bangladesh; Garrett | Bangladesh; Garrett; Knowles; Achilles Sparta^{[a]}; Péter Krajczár^{[a]} | 5:08 |
| 4. | "Halo" (Dave Audé Club Remix) | Knowles; Tedder; Bogart | Tedder; Knowles; Audé | 8:55 |
| 5. | "Broken-Hearted Girl" (Catalyst Remix) | Babyface; Eriksen; Hermansen; Knowles | Stargate; Knowles; James Cruz^{[a]} | 4:46 |
| 6. | "Ego" (OK DAC Remix) | Blac Elvis; Lilly; Knowles | Blac Elvis; Lilly; Knowles; OK DAC^{[a]} | 6:29 |
| 7. | "Sweet Dreams" (Harlan Pepper & AG III Remix) | Knowles; Jim Jonsin; Wayne Wilkins; Rico Love | Jonsin; Wilkins; Love; Knowles; Harlan Pepper & AG III Remix^{[a]} | 6:43 |
| 8. | "Ego" (Remix featuring Kanye West) | Blac Elvis; Lilly; Knowles | Blac Elvis; Lilly; Knowles | 4:44 |

=== Notes ===
- ^a – denotes a remixer.

== Personnel ==
Credits adapted from AllMusic and Above and Beyoncé: Video Collection & Dance Mixes's liner notes.

- Kory Aaron – assistance
- Damien Alexander – artists and repertoire
- Phillip Andelman – direction
- Dave Audé – production, remixing
- Babyface – writing
- Christian Baker – assistance
- Bangladesh – writing
- Tim Blacksmith – management
- E. Kidd Bogart – writing
- Ed Burke – direction
- Domenic Capello – mixing
- Jim Caruana – engineering, vocal engineering
- Fusako Chubachi – art direction
- Tony Coluccio – remixing
- Tom Coyne – mastering
- James Cruz – mastering
- Kim Dellara – executive production
- DJ Escape – remixing
- The-Dream – writing
- Mikkel Storleer Eriksen – engineering, instrumentation, writing
- Jens Gad – drums
- Toby Gad – arrangement, engineering, production, instrumentation, writing
- Tim Gant – keyboards
- Sean Garrett – writing
- Alan Gordon – engineering
- Matt Green – assistance
- Kuk Harrell – engineering, writing
- Matt Hennessy – engineering
- Ty Hunter – stylist
- Jim Jonsin – production
- Maurice Joshua – remixing
- Grant Jue – production
- Chris Kantrowitz – executive production
- Anthony Kilhoffer – vocal engineering
- Kimberly Kimble – hair stylist
- Juli Knapp – artists and repertoire
- Beyoncé – executive production, production, writing, vocals vocal production
- Mathew Knowles – executive production
- Tina Knowles – creative consultant
- Melissa Larsen – production
- Harold Lilly – production, writing
- Peter Lindbergh – photography
- Rico Love – producer, writing, vocals, vocal production
- Philip Margiziotis – horn
- Melina Matsoukas – direction
- Jake McKim – artists and repertoire
- Michael Paul Miller – assistance
- Sophie Muller – director
- Jake Nava – director
- Jeff Pantaleo – executive production
- Dave Pensado – mixing
- Jim Jonsin – writing
- Hagai Shaham – production
- Mark "Spike" Stent – mixing
- Tricky Stewart – writing
- Ryan Tedder – arrangement, engineering, instrumentation, production, writing
- Francesca Tolot – make-up
- Lidell Townsell – keyboards
- Jennifer Turner – marketing
- Randy Urbanski – assistance
- Miles Walker – engineering
- Wayne Wilkins – production, writing
- Blac Elvis – writing
- Dontae Winslow – trumpet
- John Winter – production
- Andrew Wuepper – assistance

== Charts ==
=== Weekly charts ===
2009 weekly chart performance for Above and Beyoncé: Video Collection & Dance Mixes
| Chart | Peak position |
|---|---|
| US Billboard 200 | 35 |
| US Top Dance Albums (Billboard) | 2 |
| US Top R&B/Hip-Hop Albums (Billboard) | 23 |

=== Year-end charts ===
2009 year-end chart performance for Above and Beyoncé: Video Collection & Dance Mixes
| Chart | Position |
|---|---|
| US Top Dance/Electronic Albums (Billboard) | 9 |

2010 year-end chart performance for Above and Beyoncé: Video Collection & Dance Mixes
| Chart | Position |
|---|---|
| US Top Dance/Electronic Albums (Billboard) | 21 |

== Release history ==
Release dates and formats for Above and Beyoncé: Video Collection & Dance Mixes
| Region | Date | Format(s) | Label(s) | Ref. |
|---|---|---|---|---|
| Canada | June 16, 2009 | CD+DVD | Sony Music | |
| Japan | June 16, 2009 | CD+DVD | Sony Music Japan | |
| United States | June 16, 2009 | CD+DVD | Columbia; Music World | |
| United States | June 16, 2009 | Digital download (Note: Dance Mixes only) | Columbia; Music World | |
