= The Big Pink =

English rock band

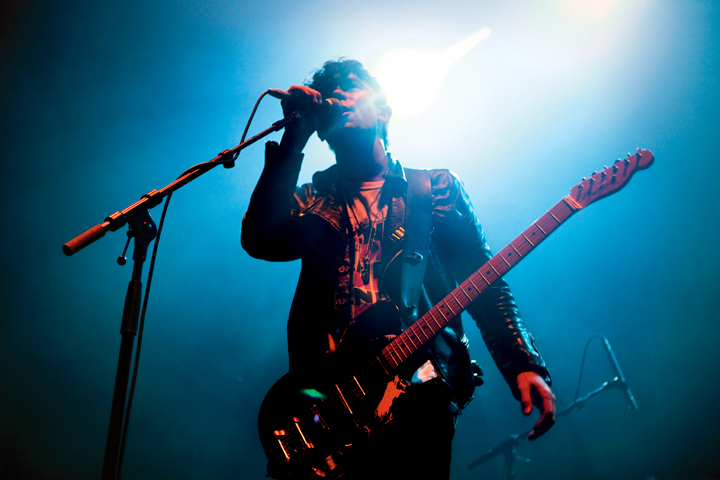
- Robbie Furze of The Big Pink performing at the Brixton Academy in London, 6 October 2009

Background information
- Origin: London, England
- Genres: Electronic rock; indie rock; noise pop; shoegaze
- Years active: 2007–present
- Labels: 4AD; Project Melody Music; management: Nanci Walker
- Members: Robbie Furze; Akiko Matsuura; Charlie Barker
- Past members: Milo Cordell; Lady Mary Charteris
- Website: musicfromthebigpink.com

The Big Pink are an English electronic rock band from London, consisting of multi-instrumentalists Robertson "Robbie" Furze, Akiko Matsuura and Charlie Barker. Initially a duo, they signed to independent record label 4AD in 2009 and won the NME Philip Hall Radar Award for best new act. To date, they have released five singles, with their debut album A Brief History of Love released in September 2009 and its follow-up, Future This released in January 2012.

== History ==
=== Beginnings and early singles ===
Robertson "Robbie" Furze and Milo Cordell started working together as The Big Pink in 2008, taking their name from The Band's debut album, Music from Big Pink. Furze used to play guitar for Alec Empire and run the record label Hate Channel with Cordell. Cordell (son of Denny Cordell and brother of Tarka Cordell) had also been releasing records through his own label Merok Records, which featured early noise rock releases by Klaxons, Titus Andronicus, and Crystal Castles. After joining forces in mid-2007, the band issued their first single "Too Young to Love" on 7" vinyl in October 2008 on the House Anxiety label. The single was limited to 500 copies worldwide, and features a homoerotic photograph by Dennis Cooper as its cover. Similarly, a limited edition 12" single for "Too Young to Love" released only in Japan features more of Cooper's photography as its cover.

The Big Pink signed with British record label 4AD in February 2009. On 25 February 2009, The Big Pink won the prestigious Philip Hall Radar Award for best new act at the NME Shockwave Awards. The duo were presented the award by James Allan and Caroline McKay of Glasvegas, who had won the award in 2008. In April, 4AD issued the duo's first single for the label, "Velvet," which Pitchfork Media described as "undeniably immense, but it's a tribute to the Big Pink's skill and maturity that it still manages to sound intimate", and awarded the track a 7 out of 10 rating. The single was again produced by the band and mixed by Alan Moulder. A 7-minute remix of "Velvet" by Gang Gang Dance followed as an online-streaming single. The Big Pink provided a cover of "Lovesong" for The Cure tribute album Pictures of You: A Tribute to Godlike Geniuses The Cure, which was made available with the 25 February 2009 issue of NME. Following the releases, the duo opened for TV on the Radio in Europe before embarking on their first headlining UK tour. A second single on 4AD, the non-album track "Stop the World", was released as a limited edition 7" single on 29 June 2009. It was co-produced with Paul Epworth.

=== A Brief History of Love ===
The Big Pink's debut album A Brief History of Love was released on 14 September 2009, the fourth single "Dominos" having been released a week before. The band produced the album themselves at Electric Lady Studios in New York City, and it was mixed by Rich Costey. Cordell told BBC 6 Music that the album encompasses "every different aspect of love... The good, the bad, the boring, the exciting, the dreams, the nightmares, the whole thing." Nationwide tours of Europe, Japan, and the United States occurred August through the end of 2009, with dates in Australia and a second North American tour set for spring 2010. They also supported Muse on their UK arena tour in November, and in turn, provided a remix of Muse's song "Undisclosed Desires," which was made available on the single released on 16 November 2009. On 24 February 2010, "Dominos" won Best Track at the NME Awards. The Big Pink appeared at the 2010 Coachella Festival in April and once again opened for Muse at London's Wembley Stadium on 10 September 2010.

=== Future This ===
In an interview with NME, Robbie Furze noted a strong hip-hop influence for the recording of the band's second album. However, he later retracted this statement regarding the band's musical direction in a further NME interview in October 2011 in which he wishes he hadn't made such a claim. He also stated that the band has approached Nick Launay and Dave Fridmann as possible producers, and added "I think we've got our heart set on Alan Moulder to mix it." The first single "Stay Gold" came out in October 2011, and was featured in SSX.

The band's second album Future This was released in January 2012. One of the songs "Lose Your Mind" started with a sample of the single "Happy House" by Siouxsie and the Banshees to get a certain vibe. The second single "Hit the Ground (Superman)" heavily sampled O Superman by Laurie Anderson.

=== Empire Underground ===
In February 2013, Furze announced on the band's Facebook page that Cordell moved to New York permanently in order to focus on his label Merok Records and would no longer be an active member of The Big Pink. Despite this, production of a third album continued with various musicians and producers including The-Drum, Supreme Cuts, Van Rivers, John O'Mahoney and Andrew Wyatt of Miike Snow.

On 26 January 2016 Big Pink released a video for the song "Hightimes" followed by a 4-song EP titled Empire Underground.

=== The Love That's Ours ===
In 2022, the band released the single "No Angels", produced by Tony Hoffer, from their third album The Love That's Ours.

== Members ==
Current members

- Robertson "Robbie" Furze – vocals, guitar, programming
- Akiko Matsuura – drums, backing vocals
- Charlie Barker – bass, backing vocals

Former members

- Milo Cordell – programming, keyboards, synthesizer, vocals
- Lady Mary Charteris – vocals, programming

Former additional personnel

- Jo Apps (sister of Patrick Wolf) – backing vocals
- Valentine Fillol-Cordier (model) – backing vocals
- Daniel O'Sullivan (of Ulver, Guapo, Sunn O))), et al.) – various instruments
- Vicky Jean Smith – drums
- Leopold Ross – bass
- Adam Prendergast – bass (live)

== Discography ==
=== Studio albums ===
Title	Details	Peak chart positions		
Title	Details	UK	BEL	US
A Brief History of Love	Released: 14 September 2009; Label: 4AD (CAD 2916); Formats: CD, 2LP, 2LP/12", DL	56	70	138
Future This	Released: 16 January 2012; Label: 4AD (CAD 3201); Formats: CD, LP, DL	96	—	—
The Love That's Ours	Released: 30 September 2022; Label: Project Melody; Formats: CD, LP, DL	—	—	—

=== Extended plays ===
- This Is Our Time (Beggars Japan, 24 June 2009) – Japan-only CD EP
- Empire Underground (B3SCI Records, 4 March 2016)

=== Singles ===
List of singles, with selected chart positions
Title	Year	Peak chart positions						Album
Title	Year	UK	BEL (FL)	IRE	JPN	MEX Air.	US Alt	Album
"Too Young to Love"^{[A]}	2008	—	—	—	—	—	—	A Brief History of Love
"Velvet"^{[A]}	2009	133	—	—	—	—	—	A Brief History of Love
"Stop the World"^{[B]}	2009	—	—	—	—	—	—	A Brief History of Love
"Dominos"	2009	27	— (Note: "Dominoes" did not enter the Flanders Ultratop 50, but peaked at number 13 on the Ultratip chart.)	10	—	14	36	A Brief History of Love
"Velvet"	2010	149	—	—	—	19	—	A Brief History of Love
"Tonight"	2010	—	—	—	—	—	—	A Brief History of Love
"Stay Gold"	2011	—	—	—	—	27	—	Future This
"Hit the Ground (Superman)"	2012	—	— (Note: "Hit the Ground (Superman)" did not enter the Flanders Ultratop 50, but peaked at number 15 on the Ultratip chart.)	—	76	39	—	Future This
"No Angels"	2022	—	—	—	—	—	—	The Love That's Ours
"Love Spins on Its Axis" (featuring Dust in the Sunlight)	2022	—	—	—	—	—	—	The Love That's Ours
"Rage"	2022	—	—	—	—	—	—	The Love That's Ours
"—" denotes a release that did not chart.

Notes

- ^{A} – Originally released as non-album tracks, but were later added to the debut album A Brief History of Love.
- ^{B} – Non-album single; released as a bonus track on the UK digital download edition and the Japanese CD pressing of A Brief History of Love.

=== Compilations ===
- "Tapes" – !K7

=== Appearances on compilations ===
- Fragments from Work in Progress (4AD, 17 April 2010)
  - A limited edition 12" EP released by 4AD for Record Store Day 2010, featuring session tracks and demos from five artists on the label's roster; includes "With You" by the band, which was previously released on the Japanese 12" for "Too Young to Love"

== Remixes ==
By other artists

- "Velvet" (BDG Remix by Gang Gang Dance)
- "Velvet" (Mount Kimbie Remix)
- "Velvet" (Van Rivers & The Subliminal Kid Remix)
- "Too Young to Love" (Delorean Remix)
- "Too Young to Love" (Too Fast to Die Remix by The Living Eye)
- "Too Young to Love" (UNKLE Surrender Sounds Session No. 14)
- "Dominos" (Rustie Remix)
- "Dominos" (Switch Remix)
- "Dominos" (Switch Remix Instrumental)
- "Tonight" (Coyote Clean Up Dirty Dub)
- "Tonight" (Ghost Hunter Remix)
- "Tonight" (oOoOO 2NITERMX)
- "Tonight" (Von Haze Remix)

Of other artists

- "22" (The Big Pink Remix) – Lily Allen
- "Devil's Trident" (The Big Pink Reality Mix) – Telepathe
- "Headlock" (The Big Pink Remix) – Esser
- "Undisclosed Desires" (The Big Pink Remix) – Muse

== Music videos ==
Year	Video	Director
2008	"Too Young to Love"	Rob Hawkins
2009	"Velvet"	Rob Hawkins
2009	"Stop the World"	John Nolan
2009	"Dominos"	Tim Saccenti
2010	"Tonight"	Rob Hawkins
2011	"Stay Gold"	Ollie Murray
2011	"Hit the Ground (Superman)"	Tim Brown
2012	"Give It Up"	
