= Too Young to Love =

Too Young to Love may refer to:

- Too Young to Love (song), a 2008 song by The Big Pink
- Too Young to Love (film), a 1959 British drama film
