= Stop the World (The Big Pink song) =

Single by The Big Pink
- Released: 29 June 2009
- Recorded: The Big Pink and Miloco Garden, London
- Genre: Indie rock
- Length: 3:46
- Label: 4AD (AD 2917)
- Songwriters: Milo Cordell, Robbie Furze
- Producers: The Big Pink, Paul Epworth

The Big Pink singles chronology
"Velvet" (2009)	"Stop the World" (2009)	"Dominos" (2009)

"Stop the World" is the third single by The Big Pink. "Stop the World" was released as a digital download and on 7" vinyl on 29 June 2009, and is not included on their debut album A Brief History of Love. The song was co-produced by the band and British record producer Paul Epworth, and mixed by Rich Costey (who also produced their debut album). The single also includes an exclusive B-side, titled "Crushed Water."

"Stop the World" was included on the Japanese pressing of A Brief History of Love as a bonus track, as well as being one of two exclusive bonus tracks on the UK iTunes version of the album. The band "disowned" the track shortly after its release: "Ironically, it was because the track was deemed 'too poppy' by Cordell and Furze that it was dropped from the full-length."

== Track listing ==
7" vinyl (AD 2917) and download

1. "Stop the World" – 3:46
2. "Crushed Water" – 5:17

== Credits ==
- All music and vocals by Robbie Furze and Milo Cordell.
1. "Stop the World"
  - Produced by The Big Pink and Paul Epworth.
  - Engineered by Mark Rankin.
  - Mixed by Rich Costey at Electric Lady Studios, New York.
  - Recorded at The Big Pink and at Miloco Garden, London.
  - Drums by Ben Dawson (Million Dead, Möngöl Hörde, Palehorse)
2. "Crushed Water"
  - Recorded and mixed by The Big Pink at The Big Pink.
  - Valentine Fillol-Cordier – backing vocals.
  - Daniel O'Sullivan – piano and violin.
- Art direction by The Big Pink.
- Design by Chris Bigg.
- Photographer unknown.
