= A Brief History of Love =

Studio album by the Big Pink
- Released: 14 September 2009
- Recorded: Electric Lady Studios, New York
- Genre: Indie rock, noise pop
- Length: 48:09
- Language: English
- Label: 4AD (CAD 2916)
- Producer: Robbie Furze, Milo Cordell

The Big Pink chronology
A Brief History of Love (2009)	Future This (2012)

Singles from A Brief History of Love
- 1. "Dominos" Released: 7 September 2009; 2. "Velvet" Released: 15 February 2010; 3. "Tonight" Released: 26 April 2010

A Brief History of Love is the debut album from British electronic rock duo the Big Pink. The album was released on 14 September 2009 on 4AD. The Big Pink signed with 4AD in February 2009, and won the prestigious NME Philip Hall Radar Award for best new act. The band were also named as "one of the most likely breakout acts of 2009" by the BBC. Prior to the album's release, the band issued three singles: "Too Young to Love"/"Crystal Visions" on the House Anxiety label in October 2008, "Velvet" on 4AD in April 2009, and the non-album track "Stop the World" in June 2009. "Dominos", the album's first proper single and the band's fourth single overall, preceded the album on 7 September.

Milo Cordell stated that the band produced the album themselves at Electric Lady Studios in New York City, and Rich Costey mixed the album (with the exception of "Velvet", which was mixed by Alan Moulder). Cordell also told BBC 6 Music how A Brief History of Love came to be the title for the release: "Every song is a love song to some degree, about every different aspect of love... The good, the bad, the boring, the exciting, the dreams, the nightmares, the whole thing, and I guess that's what encompasses the whole album, and we have a song called 'A Brief History of Love' so it's apt."

In addition to the singles "Dominos" and "Velvet", the album features re-recorded versions of previously released tracks "Too Young to Love", "Crystal Visions" and "Countbackwards from Ten". A Brief History of Love charted on the UK Albums Chart at #56, and "Dominos" charted on the UK Singles Chart at #27. A reissue of "Velvet" in February 2010 charted at #149.

== Critical reception ==
Professional ratings
Aggregate scores
Source	Rating
Metacritic	72/100
Review scores
Source	Rating
AllMusic	3.5/5 stars
BBC	Positive
The Daily Telegraph	5/5 stars
Drowned in Sound	7/10
Gigwise	4/5 stars
The Guardian	3/5 stars
NME	8/10
Pitchfork	8.2/10
Q	4/5 stars
Rolling Stone	3.5/5 stars

Critical reception to A Brief History of Love was generally positive. The Daily Telegraph awarded the album 5 out of 5 stars, and said the album "shapes up as something of a modern masterpiece." Gigwise awarded the album 4 out of 5 stars, and wrote: "It's a testament to the notion of not judging a book by its cover then that The Pink's debut LP is a heavy and gallon deep adventure into a murky darkness which sees stadium pop choruses do battle with industrial noise and an almost constant whirr of feedback." Contact Music described the album as "reminiscent of the best bits of the '90s indie scene but with the added depth of synths and the wall of guitar 'noise'. A Brief History of Love is a brilliantly bold debut that would be an asset to any record collection - it will draw you in further with every listen."

In August 2009, "Velvet" was included on Pitchfork Media's Top 500 Tracks of the 2000s list, voted in at #500. On Pitchfork's end-of-the-year Top 100 Tracks of 2009 list, "Velvet" was voted at #42, while "Dominos" was voted in at #18. A Brief History of Love was voted as the seventh best album of 2009 on NME's 50 Best Albums of 2009 list.

== Track listing ==
All tracks are written by Milo Cordell and Robbie Furze, except where noted.

No.	Title	Writer(s)	Length
1.	"Crystal Visions"		5:48
2.	"Too Young to Love"		4:09
3.	"Dominos"		3:46
4.	"Love in Vain"	Cordell, Furze, William Rees	4:08
5.	"At War with the Sun"		4:11
6.	"Velvet"		4:12
7.	"Golden Pendulum"		4:37
8.	"Frisk"		4:42
9.	"A Brief History of Love"	Cordell, Furze, Daniel O'Sullivan	4:53
10.	"Tonight"		3:35
11.	"Countbackwards from Ten"		4:08

iTunes-only bonus tracks
No.	Title	Length
12.	"Stop the World"	3:46
13.	"Dominos" (Rustie Remix)	3:22

Japan-only bonus tracks
No.	Title	Writer(s)	Length
12.	"Stop the World"		3:46
13.	"Lovesong" (The Cure cover)	Smith, Gallup, O'Donnell, Thompson, Williams	5:52
14.	"Velvet" (Van Rivers & The Subliminal Kid Remix)		4:01

Limited edition bonus 12" single (etched/one-sided pink-and-black-coloured vinyl; comes with vinyl LP #CAD D 2916)
No.	Title	Length
1.	"Velvet" (BDG Remix by Gang Gang Dance)	6:50

== Release history ==
Country	Date	Label	Format	Catalogue #
United Kingdom	14 September 2009	4AD	CD	CAD 2916 CD
United Kingdom	14 September 2009	4AD	2LP	CAD 2916
United Kingdom	14 September 2009	4AD	2LP/bonus 12" single (MIX 2916)	CAD D 2916
Worldwide	14 September 2009	4AD	Digital download	EAD 2916 A
United States	22 September 2009	4AD	CD	CAD 2916 CD
United States	20 October 2009	4AD	2LP	CAD 2916
Japan	14 October 2009	Beggars Japan/Hostess Entertainment	CD (three bonus tracks)	CAD 2916 CDJ/BGJ-10008

== Accolades ==
Publication	Country	Accolade	Year	Rank
NME	UK	Best 50 Albums of the Year	2009	#7
Spin	US	The 40 Best Albums of the Year	2009	#25

== Credits ==
=== Musicians ===
- All music and vocals by Robbie Furze and Milo Cordell.
1. "Crystal Visions"
  - Joanne Apps: backing vocals
  - Joe Scotcher: backing vocals
  - Valentine Fillol-Cordier: backing vocals
  - Akiko Matsuura: drums
  - Richard "Dickie" Landry: saxophone feedback
2. "Too Young to Love"
  - Joanne Apps: backing vocals
  - Valentine Fillol-Cordier: backing vocals
  - Al O'Connell: bass
3. "Dominos"
  - Valentine Fillol-Cordier: backing vocals
  - Akiko Matsuura: drums
4. "Love in Vain"
  - Valentine Fillol-Cordier: backing vocals
  - Akiko Matsuura: drums
  - William Rees: guitar
  - Richard "Dickie" Landry: saxophone
5. "At War with the Sun"
  - Valentine Fillol-Cordier: backing vocals
  - Akiko Matsuura: drums
6. "Velvet"
  - Lauren Jones: vocals
  - Akiko Matsuura: drums
7. "Golden Pendulum"
  - Valentine Fillol-Cordier: backing vocals
8. "Frisk"
  - Valentine Fillol-Cordier: backing vocals
  - Akiko Matsuura: drums
9. "A Brief History of Love"
  - Joanne Robertson: vocals
  - Akiko Matsuura: drums, piano
  - Daniel O'Sullivan: keyboards, guitar
10. "Tonight"
  - Valentine Fillol-Cordier: backing vocals
  - Akiko Matsuura: drums
11. "Countbackwards from Ten"
  - Valentine Fillol-Cordier: backing vocals
  - Akiko Matsuura: drums
  - Jamie Reynolds: vibes

=== Production ===
- Produced by The Big Pink at The Big Pink and Electric Lady Studios, New York.
- "Dominos" co-produced by The Big Pink and Paul Epworth at Miloco Studios, London.
- Additional production on "Tonight" by Jimmy Robertson.
- Mixed by Rich Costey at Electric Lady Studios.
- "Velvet" mixed by Alan Moulder at Assault and Battery Studios, London.
- Engineered by Jimmy Robertson.
- Design by Chris Bigg at v23.
- Crystal Visions photography by Chris Bigg. Ladies photography by Marc Atkin. Portrait by Mick Rock, 2009.
- Art direction by The Big Pink.
- "Velvet" (BDG Remix) 12" vinyl etching design by Will Bankhead.

=== Credits for bonus tracks ===
- "Stop the World"
  - Produced by Paul Epworth and The Big Pink.
  - Engineered by Mark Rankin.
  - Mixed by Rich Costey.
  - Recorded at The Big Pink and Miloco Garden.
  - Mixed at Electric Lady Studios.
- "Lovesong"
  - First appeared on The Cure tribute album Pictures of You: A Tribute to Godlike Geniuses The Cure, made available with 25 February 2009 issue of NME.
  - Produced and recorded by The Big Pink.
