= Ego (Beyoncé song) =

Single by Beyoncé

from the album I Am... Sasha Fierce
- A-side: "Sweet Dreams"
- Released: May 19, 2009
- Recorded: 2008
- Studio: Tree Sound (Atlanta, Georgia)
- Genre: R&B
- Length: 3:55
- Label: Columbia
- Composers: Elvis "Blac Elvis" Williams; Beyoncé Knowles
- Lyricists: Williams; Harold Lilly
- Producers: Blac Elvis; Beyoncé

Beyoncé singles chronology
| "Halo" (2009) | "Ego" (2009) | "Sweet Dreams" (2009) |

Music videos
- "Ego" on YouTube; "Ego" (remix) on YouTube

"Ego" is a song recorded by American singer Beyoncé for the deluxe edition of her third studio album, I Am... Sasha Fierce (2008). The song was composed by Elvis Williams, Harold Lilly, and Beyoncé. "Ego" was officially remixed with additional vocals from hip hop artist, Kanye West. Initially planned to be released in January 2009 as the second urban single in the US along with the fourth US and third international single "Halo", the release of "Ego" was canceled and replaced by "Diva". "Ego" was later issued as the third urban single, and fifth overall single in the US on May 19, 2009, alongside the sixth US and fourth international single "Sweet Dreams".

"Ego" was originally written for singer Chrisette Michele, who turned it down. It was eventually proposed to Beyoncé who used it for the deluxe edition of I Am... Sasha Fierce. In the song, Beyoncé sings about her love for the "huge ego" of her love interest. "Ego" was generally well received by music critics, many of whom praised the fact that Beyoncé opted to show some of her vocal limitations in a part of the song. Critics also noted that "Ego" could even have been placed in either disc of I Am... Sasha Fierce as it combines elements of both sides of Beyoncé's split musical personality. The remix version of "Ego" was nominated for Best Rap/Sung Collaboration at the 52nd Grammy Awards.

"Ego" became the fifth consecutive song from I Am... Sasha Fierce to reach the top 40 on US Billboard Hot 100, peaking at 39. It reached number three on the US Hot R&B/Hip-Hop Songs and was certified gold by the Recording Industry Association of America (RIAA). Despite not being released elsewhere, "Ego" reached number 11 in New Zealand and number 60 in the United Kingdom, among others. Its music video was directed by Frank Gatson, Jr, and was co-directed by Beyoncé herself, thus becoming her directorial debut. A video was also filmed for the remix version of the song with Kanye West. "Ego" was a part of Beyoncé's set list on her I Am... World Tour (2009–10).

== Background and release ==
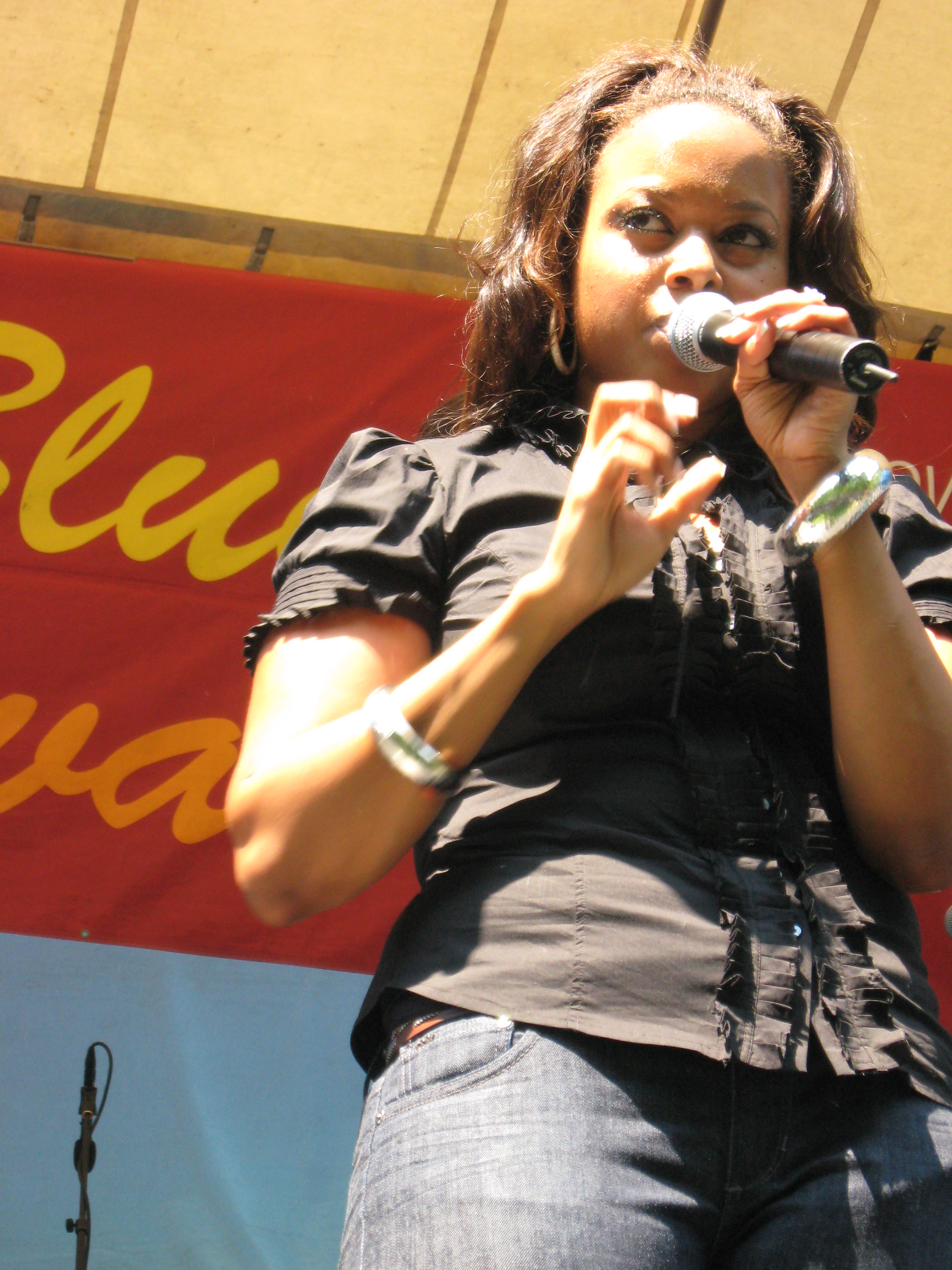
Chrisette Michele (pictured) declined to record "Ego"

"Ego" was written by Elvis Williams, Harold Lilly and Beyoncé while production was handled by Williams and Beyoncé. It was originally written for singer Chrisette Michele for her 2009 album Epiphany. However, Michele turned it down because she had written all the songs on her then-upcoming album and feared that the song might not suit her. She said, "You don't know if they're going to be able to capture your voice the same way that you captured it yourself." "Ego" was eventually proposed to Beyoncé, who used it for the deluxe edition of I Am... Sasha Fierce. It was officially remixed with added vocals from Kanye West, whom Beyoncé described as the "perfect person" to be on the remix. Elaborating on her collaboration with West, she told MTV News, "[Kanye's] voice sounds so wonderful on it. He definitely has the confidence and he backs it up. And that's what this song is about." The remix was included on the 2009 remix album Above and Beyoncé – Video Collection & Dance Mixes and the platinum edition of I Am... Sasha Fierce. Andrew Burgess of musicOMH criticized West's "lackadaisical and disappointing appearance" on the remix.

"Ego" and "Halo" were initially planned for simultaneous release in the US, following the 2008 dual lead singles "If I Were a Boy" and "Single Ladies (Put a Ring on It)". However, the release of "Ego" was scrapped and replaced with "Diva". "Ego" was later released as the fifth US single to urban contemporary radio on May 19, 2009 and to rhythmic contemporary radio on June 2, 2009, along with "Sweet Dreams". It was at first supposed to be released alongside the sixth US and fourth worldwide single "Broken-Hearted Girl"; however, at the last minute, the release of the latter was scrapped, and "Sweet Dreams" was released instead. Both tracks were taken from the ... Sasha Fierce disc. This goes in contrast to the previous joint-releases from this album where one track was taken from each disc. "Ego" was additionally released on a digital EP as a B-side single to "Sweet Dreams" on July 31, 2009, in Germany.

== Composition ==
"Ego"
A sample of the song's bridge, featuring Knowles' unpolished vocals.

According to Beyoncé, "Ego" is an R&B-leaning song with a "fun vibe". It also incorporates influences from bump jazz, soul music, and pop music. The song is built on a punchy beat and its instrumentation includes a backing piano, horns, as well as trumpets and organs. According to the sheet music published at Musicnotes.com by Hal Leonard Corporation, "Ego" is written in common time, composed in a moderate tempo, and is set in the key of D Major. The song follows the chord progression of D-Gmaj_{7}-A-A. Critics noted that "Ego" is an homage to "old-school R&B midtempo jams". Joey Guerra of Houston Chronicle described the song as a blend of "old-school soul riffs and double entendres".

Lyrically, the song features Beyoncé as the female protagonist singing about her love for the "huge ego" of her lover. Jay Lustig of New Jersey On-Line further noted that the song may be an insight into Beyoncé's marriage to Jay-Z. In an interview with Jayson Rodriguez of MTV News, Beyoncé clarified that "Ego" is on the Sasha Fierce disc because it is "fun" and very "Sasha Fierce". She further explained that "Ego" reveals the story about someone being "very confident and having [this] swagger when they walk and when they talk, and that being one of the reasons why [she is] attracted to them." The song explores the restrained vocals of Beyoncé singing "I talk like this, cos I can back it up" and consists of a piano breakdown. As Beyoncé sings, she lets out a slinky snarl in her voice. She describes the ego of her love interest as: "It's too big, it's too wide, it's too strong, it won't fit, it's too much." The remix of the song features Kanye West rapping on it. He sings the lines, "Now I'm standing next to Jay, who's standing next to B / Could have been anywhere in the world, but you're here with me / That's good for my ego... My ego is my imaginary friend / He was with me when I was only imagining."

== Critical reception ==
"Ego" received positive reviews from critics, most of whom wrote that "Ego", which is featured on the Sasha Fierce disc, could have also been placed on the I Am... disc since the lyrics seem to showcase vulnerability and the desire to be loved back while the music is completely fun like Beyoncé's alter ego. A writer for Billboard magazine gave the song a positive review, writing that "Ego" manages to combine elements of both sides of Beyoncé's musical personality. He said that the song seems to be an homage to "old-school R&B midtempo jams". He went on to praise Beyoncé's vocals, which according to him, she did not polish during the interlude, thus showing her real voice and limitations "just like the old days". Sal Cinquemani of Slant Magazine was brief and said that the song could benefit from the first half of the album. Neil McCormick of The Daily Telegraph chose "Ego" as the standout track on I Am... Sasha Fierce, complimenting its lyrical content and calling it "playful boldness".

Ann Powers of Los Angeles Times noted that in "Ego", Beyoncé shows the spunk she developed playing Etta James in Cadillac Records. IGN Music described the song as one of the "genuine shining moments" where Beyoncé's voice and the music are perfectly matched. The Village Voice's Nana Ekua Brew-Hammond described "Sasha Fierce" as "brassy, big-headed, confrontational, and witty" and wrote that all these adjectives suit "Ego". According to Jennifer Vineyard of MTV News, the song seems more like a meeting ground between the album's halves, further writing that it is "musically" with "Sasha", nevertheless thematically and lyrically, it is full-on Beyoncé; "vulnerable, wanting to love and be loved back". Nick Levine of Digital Spy commented that Beyoncé is "goddamn fabulous" on "Ego". However, Jim Farber of Daily News commented that "'Ego' avoids expectations by celebrating a man's cockiness rather than her [Beyoncé's] own." The remix version of "Ego" with Kanye West was nominated for Best Rap/Sung Collaboration at the 52nd Annual Grammy Awards but lost to "Run This Town" sung by Jay-Z featuring Rihanna and West. On The Village Voice's 2009 Pazz & Jop singles list, "Ego" was ranked at number 546.

== Chart performance ==
For the week ending June 20, 2009, "Ego" entered US Billboard Hot 100 chart at number 77, becoming Beyoncé's 19th solo entry on the chart. The song peaked at number 39 after 8 weeks on the chart issue dated August 15, 2009, becoming Beyoncé's 18th solo top 40 single and the 5th single from I Am... Sasha Fierce to crack the top 40. "Ego" fared better on the US Hot R&B/Hip-Hop Songs chart, where it peaked at number three on July 25, 2009, thus charting higher than "If I Were a Boy" and "Halo" on that chart. The song was certified gold by the Recording Industry Association of America (RIAA), and, as of October 6, 2010, has sold 357,000 downloads (excluding remix version) in the US.

Even though "Ego" was only officially released in the US, it still managed to chart in other countries. In New Zealand, the song debuted at number 28 on June 8, 2009, and peaked at number 11 on June 29, 2009, after just three weeks on the chart. Spending ten weeks on the chart, it became the fifth song from I Am... Sasha Fierce to chart within the top 40 there. The song was certified gold by Recording Industry Association of New Zealand (RIANZ) on August 7, 2011. "Ego" also bubbled at number two on the Dutch Tip Parade chart, which is equivalent to number 42 on the Dutch Top 40 Singles Chart. The song charted for four weeks on the Swedish Singles Chart, where it peaked at number 29.

"Ego" began to receive mild airplay on UK music channels as of March 2010. Consequently, it debuted at number 153 on the UK Singles Chart and at number 81 on the UK R&B Chart on April 10, 2010. One week later, due to a considerable increase in airplay, it surged to number 60 on the UK Singles Chart and peaked at number 23 on the UK R&B Chart. It later managed a better peak at number 22 on the UK R&B Chart on April 24, 2010. "Ego" is the second single from I Am... Sasha Fierce to enter both the Top 75 of UK Singles Chart and the Top 25 of the UK R&B Chart without a physical or a digital release, the first being "Diva", which peaked at number 72 on the UK Singles Chart on May 24, 2009.

== Music video ==
=== Background and synopsis ===
Beyoncé seated with her hair styled in a curly afro beside her two back-up dancers in the music video for "Ego".

Beyoncé made her directorial debut on the video for "Ego" with the choreographer Frank Gatson Jr, who had been working with her for twelve years by then, as the creative director. Gatson has been the creative director for many of her videos, such as "Suga Mama", "Single Ladies (Put a Ring on It)", and "Get Me Bodied", as well as her last three world tours, including the I Am... World Tour (2009-2010). Beyoncé let Gatson direct the video for "Ego" after he introduced her to a new choreographer, Sheryl Murakami. Beyoncé told Entertainment Weekly: "My goal for [the] video is simplicity... In 'Single Ladies (Put a Ring on It)', I saw this old tape of Bob Fosse's wife [Gwen Verdon], and I used that as inspiration. I thought in this world, with all the technology and everything that's going on, to strip everything down—great idea. So I kind of did the same thing, but glossy and black, for 'Ego'."

Like the music videos for "If I Were a Boy", "Single Ladies (Put a Ring on It)", and "Diva", the one for "Ego" was shot in black and white. The word "bitch" is muted out when Beyoncé sings, "I got every reason to feel like I'm that bitch!". "Ego" is the first video from I Am... Sasha Fierce in which she has curly afro hair, similar to the one in "Work It Out". It is also the first video from the Sasha Fierce disc of her album where she does not don her robot-glove. The video features Beyoncé and her two backup female dancers all dressed in silver leotards and performing similar choreography, which has reminiscence of that of "Single Ladies (Put a Ring on It)". Later, Beyoncé sits on a white glittery chair in front of the same tiled background; she is wearing black coat and the two dancers are still dancing in unison around her. There are a few shots of her on the chair facing the back of the camera with the dancers doing the same. Beyoncé then gets up to join the dance being executed by the two female around the chair. This scene ends as they walk to the left of the camera, into the next scene. Beyoncé is still with the tiled background. She and her dancers are now holding poles as props with which they dance. During the same pole scene, some shots of her singing in the chair are intercut. In the next scene, with the same tiled background, Beyoncé is leaning against the wall as the bridge of the song has been reached. Her dancers spin in heels around her, and they all then continue to dance against the wall. The last scene shows Beyoncé in the chair, without the black jacket and still dancing until the song ends.

=== Release and reception ===
A "bootlegged" version of the music video, featuring Sheryl Murakami performing the choreography, was leaked onto YouTube in early March 2009. In the B-roll footage on Above and Beyoncé, it was shown that a clay sculpture of Beyoncé was made for the video of "Ego". However, the sculpture was not shown in the final version of the video. Three edits exist for the "Ego" music video: an official video, a remix video featuring Kanye West, and a fan-exclusive video. The official video premiered on Beyoncé's official website on May 21, 2009. The remix music video, which features a cameo appearance of Kanye West, was included on the remix album with videography Above and Beyoncé – Video Collection & Dance Mixes. It premiered on the June 15, 2009, episode of BET's Access Granted. In the remix video, Kanye West begins his rap in an empty room next to a follow spot. At the end of his rap, he points the light towards the camera and the shot fades in white to Beyoncé's scenes. The rest of the video is nearly identical to the original video. Mark Richardson of Pitchfork Media commented that the video shows "in-your-face Kanye spitting before Beyoncé shows off some of her 'Single Ladies' moves." It was ranked at number 38 on BET's Notarized: Top 100 Videos of 2009 countdown. A fan-exclusive version of "Ego" was included on Above and Beyoncé, in which only Beyoncé appears. The whole video is a continuous double-angled scene where she is seated on the throne chair previously seen in the original video.

Upon its release, the music video for "Ego" received mixed reviews from music critics who noted similarities with the one for "Single Ladies (Put a Ring on It)". A writer of Rap-Up magazine described the video as "Single Ladies (Part 2)". Tracey Ford of AOL described the video as "an ode to multiple personalities, leotards and all things 'diva.'" Nick Levine of Digital Spy commented that the video would divide critics' opinions whether it is "a sexy, burlesque-inspired variation on the theme [Beyoncé] established in the other two videos from the Sasha Fierce side of the album, or just a 'Single Ladies' retread with more crotch and rump". Leah Greenblatt of the magazine Entertainment Weekly gave a negative review for the video, saying that it was very similar to the one for "Single Ladies" noting "[the music video for] 'Ego' feels an awful like the (admittedly awesome) 'Single Ladies' with a spiral perm." Tamar Anitai of MTV was also negative towards the video for the song, writing that it looks like a dress rehearsal of the video for "Single Ladies" but "in drag". She further wrote, "Anyway, while the '80s horns-and-organ vibe delivers some throwback flavor, I'm not feeling the circa-2002-Christina-Aguilera curly wig or the satin prom gloves. And the boob grabbing is a little too gratuitous. And when Beyonce says 'It's too big, it's too wide, it's too strong, it won't fit, it's too much,' I'm not even positive that she's really referring to an ego."

== Live performances ==
Beyoncé performed "Ego" as part of the set list during her world tour, the I Am... World Tour (2009). When she performed the song live in Seattle before of its release as a single, Kanye West joined her onstage and rapped: "I got a big, ha ha ha, ego / She love my big, ha ha ha, ego / She stroke my big, ha ha ha, ego...". West later made a surprise appearance at Beyoncé's concert in London on November 15, 2009, where he again rapped his verse. Eventually, the remix of "Ego" was included on Beyoncé's 2010 live album, I Am... World Tour as the fifteenth track. Andy Gill of The Independent listed the song as a highlight on the album.

== Use in media ==
In 2020, the song began being used in viral videos on TikTok and Instagram Reels.

== Track listing ==
- US Singles & Dance Mixes
1. "Ego" - 3:57
2. "Ego" (DJ Escape & Johnny Vicious Club Remix) - 8:22
3. "Ego" (Slang "Big Ego" Club Remix) - 6:18
4. "Sweet Dreams" - 3:29
5. "Sweet Dreams" (OK DAC Club Remix) - 5:14
6. "Sweet Dreams" (Karmatronic Club Remix) - 6:36
- Germany Digital EP
1. "Sweet Dreams" - 3:29
2. "Sweet Dreams" (Groove Police Remix) - 3:10
3. "Ego" - 3:57
4. "Ego" (Remix) [feat. Kanye West] - 4:43
5. "Sweet Dreams" (Music Video) - 4:00
6. "Ego" (Remix) [feat. Kanye West] (Music Video) - 4:52

== Credits and personnel ==
Credits for "Ego" taken from the album's liner notes.

- Beyoncé Knowles – vocals, producer, writer
- Jim Caruana – vocals recorder
- Matt Green – mixer assistant
- Donald Hayes – saxophone
- Elvis Lee – publisher
- Harold Lilly – producer, writer
- Philip Margiziotis – horns
- Mark "Spike" Stent – mixer
- Elvis "BlacElvis" Williams – producer, writer
- Dontae Winslow – trumpet
- Mack Woodard – recorder
- Jeremy "JaRe" Dishman - mixer

== Charts ==
=== Weekly charts ===
| Chart (2009–2010) | Peak position |
|---|---|
| Netherlands (Dutch Tip Parade) | 2 |
| New Zealand (Recorded Music NZ) | 11 |
| South Korea International (Gaon) | 132 |
| Sweden (Sverigetopplistan) | 29 |
| UK Singles (Official Charts) | 60 |
| UK Hip Hop/R&B (Official Charts) | 22 |
| US Billboard Hot 100 | 39 |
| US Hot R&B/Hip-Hop Songs (Billboard) | 3 |
| US Rhythmic (Billboard) | 21 |

=== Monthly charts ===
| Chart (2010) | Position |
|---|---|
| Brazil (Hot 100 Airplay) | 56 |
| Brazil (Hot Pop Songs) | 25 |

=== Year-end charts ===
| Chart (2009) | Position |
|---|---|
| Brazil (Crowley) | 75 |
| US Hot R&B/Hip-Hop Songs (Billboard) | 14 |
| US Radio Songs (Billboard) | 96 |

| Chart (2010) | Position |
|---|---|
| Brazil (Crowley) | 11 |

== Certifications ==
| Region | Certification | Certified units/sales |
|---|---|---|
| Australia (ARIA) | Gold | 35,000^{‡} |
| Brazil (Pro-Música Brasil) | Platinum | 60,000^{‡} |
| Canada (Music Canada) | Gold | 40,000^{‡} |
| New Zealand (RMNZ) | Platinum | 30,000^{‡} |
| United Kingdom (BPI) | Silver | 200,000^{‡} |
| United States (RIAA) | 2× Platinum | 2,000,000^{‡} |
| United States (RIAA) Mastertone | Gold | 500,000^{*} |
^{*} Sales figures based on certification alone.^{‡} Sales+streaming figures based on certification alone.

== Release history ==
Release dates and formats for "Ego"
| Region | Date | Format(s) | Label(s) | Ref. |
|---|---|---|---|---|
| United States | May 19, 2009 | Urban contemporary radio | Columbia | |
| United States | June 2, 2009 | Rhythmic contemporary radio | Columbia | |
| United States | July 21, 2009 | Digital download (EP) (Note: "Ego" was released as a double A-side single with "Sweet Dreams" on the digital EP.) | Columbia; Music World | |
