= Dominos (song) =

Single by The Big Pink

from the album A Brief History of Love
- Released: 7 September 2009
- Recorded: Electric Lady Studios, New York
- Genre: Indie rock, electronic rock
- Length: 3:46
- Label: 4AD (AD 2931)
- Songwriters: Milo Cordell, Robbie Furze
- Producers: The Big Pink, Paul Epworth

The Big Pink singles chronology
"Stop the World" (2009)	"Dominos" (2009)	"Velvet" (2010)

"Dominos" is the first single from The Big Pink's debut album A Brief History of Love. "Dominos" was released as a digital download and on 7" vinyl on 7 September 2009, a week before the release of the album. The song was co-produced by the band and record producer Paul Epworth, and mixed by Rich Costey (who also produced the album). In their native United Kingdom, the song peaked on the UK Singles Chart at #27 and #10 on the Irish Singles Chart in the Republic of Ireland. The single's B-side, "She's No Sense", features vocals from Florence Welch of Florence and the Machine.

"Dominos" is The Big Pink's fourth single, three having been released before their debut album throughout 2008 and 2009. The song was remixed by Switch and made available as a free digital download track on the band's website on 23 October 2009. "Dominos" has also been featured in Xbox 360 television advertisements in the United Kingdom. In the United States, the song was used in a promo spot for Skins series 3 premiere on BBC America. The song was featured in the episode "Let The Games Begin" of 90210. An instrumental version of the song also appeared in the Jaguar Cars commercials in the US (most notably in the commercials for its 2010 XJ) from 2010 to 2012.

On Pitchfork Media's end-of-the-year Top 100 Tracks of 2009 list, "Dominos" was voted in at #18. On 24 February 2010, "Dominos" won Best Track of the Year at the NME Awards. In October 2011, NME placed it at number 72 on its list "150 Best Tracks of the Past 15 Years".

The song is heavily sampled on Nicki Minaj's track "Girls Fall Like Dominoes" on her debut album Pink Friday.

== Track listing ==
7" vinyl (AD 2931) and download

1. "Dominos" – 3:48
2. "She's No Sense" – 3:15

Remixes

- "Dominos" (Rustie Remix), 3:22 – available as a bonus track exclusively with the UK iTunes version of A Brief History of Love
- "Dominos" (Switch Remix), 5:32 – available as a free download on the band's website in October 2009
- "Dominos" (Switch Remix Instrumental), 5:18 – also available from the band's website in October 2009

== Charts ==
Chart (2009)	Peak position
UK Singles Chart	27
UK Indie Chart	2
Irish Singles Chart	10
US Billboard Alternative Songs	36

== Credits ==
- All music and vocals by Robbie Furze and Milo Cordell
1. "Dominos"
  - Produced by The Big Pink and Paul Epworth
  - Valentine Fillol-Cordier – backing vocals
  - Akiko Matsuura – drums
  - Engineered by Mark Rankin
  - Mixed by Rich Costey
2. "She's No Sense"
  - Produced and mixed by The Big Pink
  - Florence Welch – vocals
- Art direction by The Big Pink
- Design by Chris Bigg
- Photography by Marc Atkins at panoptika.net
