= Five Suns (album) =

Studio album by Guapo
- Released: 13 January 2004
- Recorded: August 2002 – April 2003 at Zed One Studios in London
- Genre: Progressive rock
- Length: 62:47
- Label: Cuneiform Records

Guapo chronology
Great Sage, Equal of Heaven (2001)	Five Suns (2004)	Black Oni (2005)

Five Suns is an album by progressive rock group Guapo released in 2004.

== Track listing ==
All music written by Guapo

1. Five Suns I (4:31)
2. Five Suns II (10:19)
3. Five Suns III (10:30)
4. Five Suns IV (12:57)
5. Five Suns V (7:55)
- Total length: 46:34
6. (Untitled) (1:00)
7. Mictlan (8:58)
8. Topan (6:37)

== Personnel ==
Guapo

- Daniel O'Sullivan – Fender Rhodes, Organ, Mellotron, Harmonium, Guitar, Electronics
- Dave Smith – Drums, Percussion
- Matt Thompson – Bass, Guitar, Electronics

Production

- Pete Lyons – Engineer
- Yukimaro Takematsu – Design, Art Direction
