= Black Oni =

Studio album by Guapo
- Released: 8 March 2005
- Genre: Progressive rock
- Length: 44:30
- Label: Ipecac Recordings
- Producer: Pete Lyons

Guapo chronology
Five Suns (2004)	Black Oni (2005)	Elixirs (2008)

Black Oni is an album by progressive rock group Guapo released in 2005.

== Track listing ==
All music written by Guapo

1. I (3:33)
2. II (11:54)
3. III (10:20)
4. IV (5:44)
5. V (12:56)

== Personnel ==
Guapo

- Daniel O'Sullivan – Fender Rhodes, Keyboards, Harmonium, Mellotron, Guitar, Electronics
- Dave Smith – Drums, Percussion
- Matt Thompson – Bass, Guitar, Electronics

Production

- Pete Lyons – Producer, Mixing Engineer
- Jaime Gomez Arellano – Mastering Engineer
- Yukimaro Takematsu – Photography, Design Art Direction
