= Future This =

Studio album by the Big Pink
- Released: 11 January 2012
- Studio: Smokehouse (London) (Note: Additional vocals on tracks 3, 4, 6 and 8); The Fortress (London) (Note: Additional drums)
- Genre: Electronic rock; indie rock; shoegaze
- Length: 44:27
- Label: 4AD
- Producer: Paul Epworth

The Big Pink chronology
A Brief History of Love (2009)	Future This (2012)	The Love That's Ours (2022)

Singles from Future This
- 1. "Stay Gold" Released: 14 November 2011; 2. "Hit the Ground (Superman)" Released: 30 January 2012

Professional ratings
Aggregate scores
Source	Rating
Metacritic	60/100
Review scores
Source	Rating
AllMusic	3.5/5 stars
The A.V. Club	B
Clash	7/10
Drowned in Sound	7/10
Entertainment Weekly	B+
The Guardian	2/5 stars
NME	6/10
Pitchfork	5.2/10
PopMatters	7/10
Slant Magazine	2.5/5 stars

Future This is the second studio album by English electronic rock duo the Big Pink, released on 11 January 2012 by 4AD. The album was preceded by the release of lead single "Stay Gold" on 14 November 2011.

== Track listing ==
All tracks are written by Milo Cordell and Robbie Furze; additional writers indicated

No.	Title	Writer(s)	Length
1.	"Stay Gold"	Paul Epworth	3:38
2.	"Hit the Ground (Superman)"	Epworth; Laurie Anderson	4:56
3.	"Give It Up"	Epworth; Earl Randle	4:49
4.	"The Palace"	Epworth	4:19
5.	"1313"		5:52
6.	"Rubbernecking"	Epworth	3:27
7.	"Jump Music"		4:38
8.	"Lose Your Mind"		4:09
9.	"Future This"	Daniel O'Sullivan	3:56
10.	"77"		4:43

iTunes Store bonus track
No.	Title	Length
11.	"England"	3:13

=== Sample credits ===
- "Hit the Ground (Superman)" features samples from "O Superman" by Laurie Anderson.
- "Give It Up" incorporates elements of and features samples from "I'm Gonna Tear Your Playhouse Down" by Ann Peebles.
- "Lose Your Mind" contains elements of "Happy House" by Siouxsie and the Banshees.

== Personnel ==
Credits adapted from the liner notes of Future This.

=== The Big Pink ===
- Milo Cordell
- Robbie Furze
- Victoria Smith – drums (track 9)
- Zan Lyons – additional viola, programming

=== Additional musicians ===
- Sally Herbert – additional strings arrangement, violin (track 10)
- Ian Burdge – cello (track 10)
- Chris Prendergast – drums (track 1)

=== Technical ===
- Paul Epworth – production
- Mark Rankin – engineering
- Joe Hartwell Jones – engineering assistance
- Alan Moulder – mixing
- John Catlin – mixing assistance
- Jimmy Robertson – additional vocals recording (tracks 3, 4, 6, 8)
- Tom Morris – additional drums recording

=== Artwork ===
- Tom Beard – band photograph
- David Emery – booklet photography
- Alison Fielding – design

== Charts ==
Chart performance for Future This
Chart (2012)	Peak position
Australian Hitseekers Albums (ARIA)	12
Belgian Heatseekers Albums (Ultratop Flanders)	11
Belgian Heatseekers Albums (Ultratop Wallonia)	20
UK Albums (OCC)	96
UK Independent Albums (OCC)	10
US Heatseekers Albums (Billboard)	6
US Independent Albums (Billboard)	32

== Release history ==
Release history for Future This
Region	Date	Label	Ref.
Japan	11 January 2012	Hostess Entertainment	
Australia	13 January 2012	Remote Control	
Germany	13 January 2012	4AD	
United Kingdom	16 January 2012	4AD	
United States	17 January 2012	4AD	
France	24 January 2012	4AD	
