= Too Young to Love (song) =

Single by The Big Pink
- Released: 7 October 2008
- Recorded: The Big Pink, London
- Genre: Indie rock, electronic rock
- Length: 4:21
- Label: House Anxiety (HA001)
- Songwriters: Milo Cordell, Robbie Furze
- Producer: The Big Pink

The Big Pink singles chronology
"Too Young to Love" (2008)	"Velvet" (2009)

"Too Young to Love" is the debut single by The Big Pink. "Too Young to Love" was released with the double A-side track "Crystal Visions" on 7" vinyl on October 7, 2008, and both tracks were later re-recorded and included on their debut album A Brief History of Love in September 2009. The song was self-produced by the band, and the single was a limited edition pressing of only 500 copies. The sleeve features a homoerotic photograph by Dennis Cooper as its cover. Similarly, a limited edition 12" single for "Too Young to Love," released in Japan only on April 1, 2009, features more of Cooper's photography as its cover. The 12" also features an early version of "Count Backwards from Ten," which was also re-recorded for the debut album, and the exclusive non-album track "With You."

The Big Pink signed with famed British record label 4AD in February 2009, won the prestigious Philip Hall Radar Award for best new act at the NME Shockwave Awards, and released their second single "Velvet" in April 2009. Remixes of "Too Young to Love" by Delorean, The Living Eye, and UNKLE surfaced throughout 2009.

== Track listing ==
7" vinyl (House Anxiety Records, HA001)

1. "Too Young to Love" – 4:21
2. "Crystal Visions" – 3:56

Japan-only 12" vinyl (Big Love Records, BIGLOVE003)

1. "Too Young to Love" – 4:21
2. "Count Backwards from Ten" – 3:34
3. "With You" – 3:27

Remixes

- "Too Young to Love" (Delorean Remix), 5:27 – available as an online streaming single.
- "Too Young to Love" (Too Fast to Die Remix by The Living Eye), 7:12 – available as an online streaming single.
- "Too Young to Love" (UNKLE Surrender Sounds Session #14), 4:40 – available on UNKLE's Global Underground 037: Bangkok DJ mix album in August 2009.

== Credits ==
- All music and vocals by Robbie Furze and Milo Cordell.
- Produced by The Big Pink at The Big Pink.
- Al O'Connell – bass.
- Cover image by Dennis Cooper.
