= Diva (Beyoncé song) =

Single by Beyoncé

from the album I Am... Sasha Fierce
- A-side: "Halo"
- Released: January 20, 2009
- Recorded: 2008
- Studio: Bangladesh; Patchwerk; Silent Sound (Atlanta)
- Genre: Southern hip hop; R&B
- Length: 3:20
- Label: Columbia
- Songwriters: Beyoncé Knowles; Shondrae Crawford; Sean Garrett
- Producers: Bangladesh; Sean Garrett; Beyoncé Knowles

Beyoncé singles chronology
| "At Last" (2008) | "Diva" / "Halo" (2009) | "Ego" (2009) |

Music video
- "Diva" on YouTube

"Diva" is a song recorded by American singer Beyoncé. It was written and produced by Beyoncé, Shondrae "Bangladesh" Crawford, and Sean Garrett for Beyoncé's third studio album I Am... Sasha Fierce (2008). It was released as the album's third overall single in the United States alongside the third international single "Halo". "Diva" is an R&B song, which is set with a southern hip hop flavored groove, and carries a stuttering beat. Its lyrics deliver messages of independence and female empowerment. The song boasts a beat and a bassline similar to those of another Bangladesh 2008 production, "A Milli" by American rapper, Lil' Wayne; critics coined "Diva" as a "female companion" to the latter.

"Diva" received mixed to positive reviews from critics, who had polarized opinions concerning its affiliation with "A Milli". Despite being released to rhythmic and urban radios only in the US, the song peaked at number 19 on the US Billboard Hot 100 chart, topped the US Hot Dance Club Play chart, and attained a peak position of number three on the US Hot R&B/Hip-Hop Songs chart. "Diva" was certified double platinum by the Recording Industry Association of America (RIAA), denoting shipment of 2,000,000 copies. Although it was only officially released in the US, the song appeared on the singles charts in Australia, Ireland, the Netherlands, New Zealand, and the United Kingdom.

The accompanying music video for "Diva" was directed by Melina Matsoukas. It shows the singer and backup dancers in a warehouse, and presents a choreography similar to that of her previous single "Single Ladies (Put a Ring on It)" (2008). Beyoncé also appears in different Thierry Mugler couture pieces. The video received mixed response from critics, who were not pleased by its concept as they believed it portrayed Beyoncé's alter ego Sasha Fierce ineffectively. It was ranked at number 13 on BET's Notarized: Top 100 Videos of 2009 countdown. Although Beyoncé did not perform the song in any televised appearances, it was a part of her set list on various of her world tours, from I Am... (2010) tour onwards.

== Background and release ==
"Diva" was written and produced by Beyoncé, Shondrae "Bangladesh" Crawford, and Sean Garrett. According to an interview that Bangladesh gave with Rap-Up, the song was originally intended to be included on the track-listing of his own mixtape after choosing a female artist to contribute vocals to "Diva". However, he decided to play the song to American R&B singer Keyshia Cole, who liked the beat, but not the whole track. She eventually declined to record the song, but later said she would sing the song, however, by this time Beyoncé also wanted it for her then upcoming album. Bangladesh ultimately gave "Diva" to Beyoncé and composed another song for Cole. About one month after the release of I Am... Sasha Fierce, American R&B singer Ciara, who was working on her third studio album, Fantasy Ride (2009), remixed "Diva", which was supposed to be included on her Fantasy Ride Mixtape.

"Ego" and "Halo" were initially planned for simultaneous release in the US, following the 2008 dual lead singles "If I Were a Boy" and "Single Ladies (Put a Ring on It)". However, the release of "Ego" was scrapped and replaced with "Diva", which was taken from a different disc of I Am... Sasha Fierce to "Halo"; the intention was to demonstrate the concept that Beyoncé has conflicting personalities. "Diva" added to urban contemporary radio and rhythmic contemporary radios playlists, while "Halo" was sent to contemporary hit radio on January 20, 2009. In Germany, "Diva" was featured as the B-side to "Halo" single. Upon its release, contemporary music critics noted many similarities between Beyoncé's "Diva" and Lil Wayne's 2008 song "A Milli"; both feature a similar beat produced by Bangladesh. In an interview with MySpace, Beyoncé agreed that "Diva" is the woman's equivalent to "A Milli". However, she stated that it was not consciously. "Diva" eventually became known as the feminine companion to "A Milli".

== Composition and lyrical interpretation ==
"Diva"
"Diva" features a heavy bass and a stuttering hip hop beat. Owing to their aural similarities, "Diva" has been coined a "female companion" to Lil Wayne's "A Milli".

"Diva" is an R&B and hip hop song, which is composed in a moderate tempo in the key of E major. It carries a stuttering beat, which is accompanied by a slow-rolling and heavy bass-pumping groove with a jerky rhythm. The song marks a change of direction for Beyoncé; she raps in cadences over a Roland TR-808 machine, kick drums, and fewer instruments than her usual tracks. As stated by Andy Kellman of Allmusic, "Diva" aurally resembles Beyoncé's own 2006 songs "Freakum Dress" and "Ring the Alarm". Spence D. of IGN Music further compared its hip hop composition to Missy Elliott's earlier songs. Adam Mattera of The Observer noted "Diva" could be "a perfect independent women anthem"; its lyrics reflect a message of courage and determination. Similarly, Houston Chronicle's Joey Guerra called the song an "ode to female fabulousness".

"Diva" features Beyoncé as the female protagonist speaking about being a diva. Chipmunked vocal samples and overdubs aplenty make up the song's foundation. According to Nick Levine of Digital Spy, Beyoncé's alter ego Sasha Fierce also salutes her earning power and proclaims herself as the "number one diva in the game". "Diva" begins with metallic kick drum complemented by Beyoncé's robotic sly vocal stutters as she sings: "I'm a, I'm a, a diva". She then starts the first verse, chanting the dictionary definition of a diva. She references her millions of dollars, and raps, "I done got so sick and filthy with benjis, I can't spend it", channeling her alter ego. After repeating the introductory lines, Beyoncé employs breathy drawls and robotic shouts to chant the chorus, where the lines, "Now diva is a female version of a hustla. Of a hustla. Of a, of a hustla", are looped. In the second verse, she finds love in the club, where she warns "Better have a six-pack in the cooler ... If you ain’t gettin[g] money, then you ain't got nothin[g] for me", and asks, "Where yo Boss at?" After singing the third verse and the chorus for the third time, Beyoncé adopts her initial chipmunked vocals to end the song, chanting, "I'm a, I'm a, a diva".

== Critical reception ==
The song received mixed to positive reviews, with critics either praising or criticizing it being a female companion to "A Milli." Matos Michaelangelo of The A.V. Club said that "Diva" is a flagrant attempt to write a female version of "A Milli". Leah Greenblat of Entertainment Weekly wrote that "Diva" can make a good feminine companion to "A Milli" thanks to their use of similar music instruments." Noting its similarity to "A Milli", Andy Kellman of Allmusic picked out "Diva" as one of the three standout tracks from the album. J. Freedom du Lac of The Washington Post chose it as one of the best songs on I Am... Sasha Fierce, calling it a "fun, [and] tuneless, gender-twisting play". Colin McGuire of PopMatters picked "Diva" as the highlight of the album, noting its "Lil Wayne-inspired beat" and describing it as "cheeky". He further wrote it shows the singer's "impeccable street side... with enough attitude to make it work".

Greg Kot of Chicago Tribune commented that the "menacing rhythm and chanted vocals" on "Diva", mark the album's biggest departure. Adam Mazmanian of The Washington Times felt that the song was influenced by Beyoncé's husband, American rapper Jay-Z as it has a "bad soft-core gangster rap". He also noted that its contains words that could get an "explicit" sticker by the chain stores. Similarly, Daniel Brockman of The Phoenix remarked that the song is "particularly intriguing" as it progresses through "hard-knockish robbery scenarios" which does not resemble Beyoncé's clean public image. Stacey Anderson of Spin magazine noted that "Diva" places a "startling, sexy snarl over window-rattling bass". Christian Hoard of Rolling Stone noted Beyoncé turns out "modal-sounding hooks" over 808 bass on the song. The Village Voice's Nana Ekua Brew-Hammond described Sasha Fierce as "suffer [sic] no such identity crisis, brassy, big-headed, confrontational, and witty...", reflected on "Diva". James Reed of The Boston Globe described "Diva" as a "glitchy, bass-heavy thumper with the most ridiculous chorus of the year". Reed nevertheless added that the song is "insanely catchy, but then, when you hear something looped incessantly, no matter how mindless, it's bound to stick".

Mariel Concepcion of Billboard magazine noted that "Diva" is not something new, nevertheless it manages to be a radio-ready dance song. Alex Thornton of AllHipHop noted that Beyoncé adopts a masculine character on "Diva" and that it is "something decent to bounce to at least". The Observer's Adam Mattera described the song as a potential source of inspiration to drag queens, however concluded that it can also leave many persons confused and bewildered. Alexis Petridis of The Guardian, also reviewed the song negatively, stating, "The sonic trickery on the most experimental track, 'Diva', isn't interesting enough to distract you from the absence of a tune." Spence D. of IGN Music, felt that Beyoncé's rapping in the song was a "bad idea" and described the song as "awkward, [and] horribly dated." On The Village Voice's 2009 Pazz & Jop singles list, "Diva" was ranked at number 224. In 2013, John Boone and Jennifer Cady of E! Online placed the song at number nine on their list of ten best Beyoncé's songs.

== Chart performance ==
Initially, "Diva" charted on the Billboard's Bubbling Under Hot 100 Singles chart at number five. For the week ending January 3, 2009, the song debuted on the main US Billboard Hot 100 chart at number 96, and peaked at number 19 on the issue dated March 7, 2009, becoming Beyoncé's sixteenth top twenty single on the chart. "Diva" reached number one on the US Hot Dance Club Play chart on March 28, 2009, giving Beyoncé her ninth number one on the chart. It peaked at number three on the US Hot R&B/Hip Hop Songs chart from the week ending February 14, 2009 to the week ending March 14, 2009. "Diva" was certified gold by the Recording Industry Association of America (RIAA) on March 12, 2009. As of October, 2012, it had sold 1,037,000 digital downloads in the US. In August, 2022 the song was certified double platinum with over 2,000,000 copies.

Even though "Diva" was only officially released in the US, it managed to chart in other countries. In Australia, the song debuted at number 47 on March 15, 2009, becoming the fourth single from the I Am… Sasha Fierce to reach the top fifty of the ARIA Singles Chart. and peaked at number 40 on April 12, 2009. In New Zealand, "Diva" entered at number 32 on March 30, 2009 and peaked at number 26 for two non-consecutive weeks on April 6, 2009 and April 27, 2009. On the UK Singles Chart, "Diva" rose from number 173 to number 73 on the UK Singles Chart on May 17, 2009 based on downloads alone. The following week, it peaked at number 72. In the Netherlands, "Diva" debuted at number 94 on the Mega Single Top 100 and peaked at number 73, based on downloads alone.

== Music video ==
=== Background and concept ===
The music video for "Diva" used similar concepts to "Crazy in Love".

The accompanying music video for "Diva" was shot in Downtown Los Angeles on November 22, 2008, and was directed by Melina Matsoukas, who worked with Beyoncé for several music videos. The music video is conceptually similar to that for "Single Ladies (Put a Ring on It)" in the sense that it was filmed in black and white, shows Beyoncé as alter ego Sasha Fierce, who dons her metal glove and performs choreography with two back-up dancers with more formal leotards. Beyoncé wears a Gareth Pugh design in the video, a custom Brian Lichtenberg bodysuit, as well as a couple of vintage Thierry Mugler Haute Couture pieces, including a leather bodice and a reptilia inspired gown.

The video for "Diva" premiered on the iTunes Store on December 23, simultaneously with the one for "Halo". It was included on Beyoncé's remix album with videography, Above and Beyoncé (2009).

=== Synopsis ===
The video begins with a dictionary definition of the word "diva", before cutting to a parking lot outside of a warehouse. Beyoncé, wearing a pair of "dangle shades", walks past a car full of mannequin parts into the warehouse. From here, she is accompanied by her two dancers and a variety of high fashion outfits. When she states "Diva's gettin' money..." she waves a fan made of $100 bills. During the bridge to the climax, Beyoncé dances on a single light and then during the climax, she is seen very glossy in another wardrobe choice dancing in robotic movements to the beat with gold punctuating the black and white scene. In one scene, Beyoncé is seen dancing robotically in front of a set of gold-tinted mannequins; while in another, she dances against a wall with two large chains hanging from the ceiling. During the last chorus, Beyoncé is in her last wardrobe change in front of window which is where the paparazzi had taken photos of her. At the end of the song, Beyoncé walks back out to the parking lot. She lights up a cigar and throws the lighter into the car, letting it explode. As she walks away, the intro to "Video Phone" (a track from I Am... Sasha Fierce) plays. The explosion retains its original fiery colors in contrast with the black and white.

=== Reception ===
A writer of Rolling Stone described the video as "quite a hot mess", further comparing the dancers with the ones from the video for "Single Ladies (Put a Ring on It)". The writer finished the review calling it "a four-minute art-school film unworthy of her Sasha Fierceness". Jennifer Cady of E! Online commented that the video was "all about being gritty and edgy, like strutting around a downtown L.A. warehouse in crazy designer fashion and chewing bubblegum. Hard-core style". Cady further described the dance in the video for "Diva" as "way easier to learn than [the one] in 'Single Ladies (Put a Ring on It)'". However, she chose the C-3PO-inspired mannequins, the lack of Beyoncé's robot hand and the "obnoxious camera work or car explosion" as the worst parts of the video. Entertainment Weekly's Michael Slezak commented: "The video has the production values of the clearance bin at Family Dollar, and yet somehow it works." Slezak further described the set as a "trunk full of mannequins, Cylon-y fringed sunglasses, and angry-lady dancing on display in the accompanying video". The video was ranked at number 13 on Black Entertainment Television's (BET's) Notarized: Top 100 Videos of 2009 countdown.

== Live performances ==
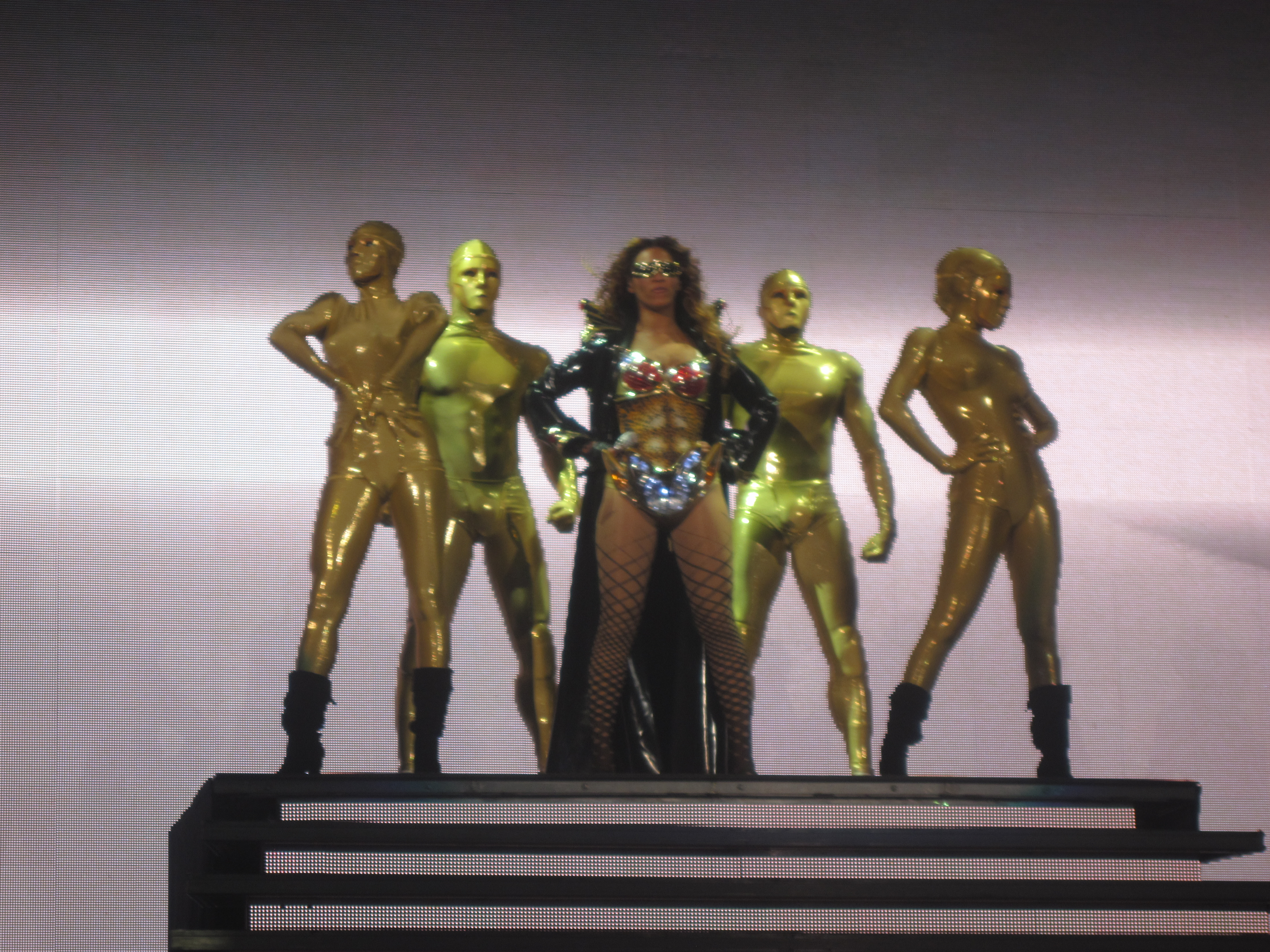
Beyoncé performing "Diva" on her I Am... World Tour.

Although Beyoncé did not perform "Diva" on televised appearances, the song was a part of her set list on the I Am... World Tour (2009-2010). Eventually, it was included on her 2010 live album, I Am... World Tour as the twelfth song. The performance of "Diva" during her I Am... World Tour features Beyoncé performing the song while being backed up by six dancers (four of which are golden mannequins). She sports a leopard print glow-in-the-dark leotard, black trenchcoat, leopard print stockings, high heels and leopard-print sunglasses. She would remove the trenchcoat during the performance. The song was also included on the setlist for her Formation World Tour (2016), as the fifteenth song performed each night. Alice Jones of The Independent felt that "she sings her heart out" during the electro hook of "Diva". In May 2012, Beyoncé performed "Diva" during her Revel Presents: Beyoncé Live revue in Atlantic City, New Jersey, United States' entertainment resort, hotel, casino and spa, Revel. Maura Johnston of The Village Voice noted that the song was one of the "dancefloor-fillers" performed during the revue. Rebecca Thomas writing for MTV News, noted that Beyoncé transformed in Sasha Fierce for the performance of the song. On October 7, 2012, Beyoncé appeared at Jay-Z's concert at the Barclays Center and performed "Diva", "Crazy in Love" and "Young Forever".

Beyonce has also performed this song during her co-headline On the Run and On the Run II tours with her husband Jay-Z, as a mash-up with his "Clique". The song was performed during her Coachella set in 2018. In 2023, Beyoncé performed "Diva" once again during her Renaissance World Tour, this time mashed-up with Lil Uzi Vert's "Just Wanna Rock". In 2025, The song was also performed during her Cowboy Carter Tour, mashed up with "David Banner's "Like a Pimp".

== Cover versions ==
In 2008, Ciara recorded a remix of "Diva" for a mixtape of her album Fantasy Ride (2009). Alex Newell, Heather Morris, Jenna Ushkowitz and Darren Criss covered the song in the eponymous episode of the fourth season of the American television series Glee which aired on February 7, 2013. In a review of the episode, Daniel Sperling of the website Digital Spy, described the performance of the song as one of the "plenty of fierce moments" adding that it was "posy, [and] pouty".

== Credits and personnel ==
- Beyoncé Knowles – vocals, producer, writer
- Kory Aaron – producer assistant
- Jim Caruana – recorder
- Shondrae "Bangladesh" Crawford – writer, producer
- Sean Garrett – writer, producer
- Matt Green – mixer assistant
- Michael Miller – producer assistant
- Mark "Spike" Stent – mixer
- Miles Walker – producer

== Charts ==
=== Weekly charts ===
2009–2010 weekly chart performance for "Diva"
| Chart (2009–2010) | Peak position |
|---|---|
| Australia (ARIA) | 40 |
| Australia Urban (ARIA) | 12 |
| Brazil (Hot 100 Airplay) | 1 |
| CIS Airplay (TopHit) | 164 |
| Germany (Official German Charts) with "Halo" | 5 |
| Global Dance Tracks (Billboard) | 20 |
| Ireland (IRMA) | 50 |
| Netherlands (Single Top 100) | 73 |
| New Zealand (Recorded Music NZ) | 26 |
| South Korea International (Gaon) | 60 |
| UK Singles (Official Charts) | 72 |
| UK Hip Hop/R&B (Official Charts) | 22 |
| US Billboard Hot 100 | 19 |
| US Dance Club Songs (Billboard) | 1 |
| US Hot R&B/Hip-Hop Songs (Billboard) | 3 |
| US Rhythmic (Billboard) | 11 |

2024 weekly chart performance for "Diva"
| Chart (2024) | Peak position |
|---|---|
| Greece International (IFPI) | 52 |

=== Year-end charts ===
Year-end chart performance for "Diva"
| Chart (2009) | Position |
|---|---|
| Australia Urban (ARIA) | 50 |
| Brazil (Hot 100 Airplay) | 45 |
| Germany (Official German Charts) with "Halo" | 18 |
| US Billboard Hot 100 | 82 |
| US Dance Club Songs (Billboard) | 24 |
| US Hot R&B/Hip-Hop Songs (Billboard) | 22 |

== Certifications ==
Certifications and sales for "Diva"
| Region | Certification | Certified units/sales |
|---|---|---|
| Australia (ARIA) | Platinum | 70,000^{‡} |
| Brazil (Pro-Música Brasil) | 2× Platinum | 120,000^{‡} |
| Canada (Music Canada) | Platinum | 80,000^{‡} |
| New Zealand (RMNZ) | Platinum | 30,000^{‡} |
| United Kingdom (BPI) | Gold | 400,000^{‡} |
| United States (RIAA) | 2× Platinum | 2,000,000 |
| United States (RIAA) Mastertone | Gold | 500,000^{*} |
^{*} Sales figures based on certification alone.^{‡} Sales+streaming figures based on certification alone.

== Release history ==
Release dates and formats for "Diva"
| Region | Date | Format(s) | Label(s) | Ref. |
|---|---|---|---|---|
| United States | January 20, 2009 | Rhythmic contemporary radio; urban contemporary radio | Columbia | |

== See also ==
- List of Billboard Hot Dance Club Play number ones of 2009
