= Guapo (band) =

- Genres: Avant-prog
- Years active: 1994–present
- Members: David J. Smith; Kavus Torabi; Emmett Elvin; Sam Warren
- Past members: Matt Thompson; Rojer Macoustra; Pid; Caroline Kraabel; Daniel O'Sullivan; James Sedwards

Guapo are a British experimental rock/art rock band formed in 1994 by drummer/percussionist Dave Smith and guitarist/vocalist Matt Thompson, though the band gained a wider audience with the contribution of multi-instrumentalist Daniel O'Sullivan. The lineup as of 2015 consists of Smith, guitarist Kavus Torabi, bassist Sam Warren and keyboardist Emmett Elvin of Chrome Hoof.

== Music ==
Guapo have affiliations with the Rock in Opposition movement, after performing with bands such as Magma and Present at the Rock in Opposition Festival at Carmaux, France in 2007.

== The Trilogy ==
The Guapo album Elixirs concludes a recondite trilogy of recordings initiated by Five Suns (2003) and Black Oni (2004), which has been referred to as the "Empire Strikes Back" record. Every record takes on new musical hues and offers disparate ideas and perspectives. However, an upheaval in the line-up, which of recent years had been anchored by the trio of Daniel O'Sullivan, Matthew Thompson, and David Smith, triggered a change in course when Thompson left the band in 2005.

== Other projects ==
Both Smith and O'Sullivan perform in the antique-prog band Miasma & the Carousel of Headless Horses. Smith created a large scale, multi media installation entitled "The Other Side of the Island" for which he made a soundtrack with O’Sullivan and Antti Uusimaki under The Stargazers Assistant moniker (the recordings of which were released on Aurora Borealis last year). Smith also plays with members of Coil, Cyclobe and Shock Headed Peters in the Amal Gamal Ensemble. Despite these distractions, Guapo has been maintained as a primary focus and "Elixirs" has been three years in the making.

== Line-up ==
Following the departure of Thompson, O’Sullivan and Smith added two London musicians to the fold, James Sedwards (of avant-rock band Nought) and Kavus Torabi (of Cardiacs, Knifeworld and formerly The Monsoon Bassoon). The line-up toured the US in 2006 with synth-prog band, Zombi. O'Sullivan recently left the band to concentrate on other projects (Æthenor (Vhf Records), Mothlite (Southern Records), Grumbling Fur as well as moonlighting in the live line-up of Sunn O)))) and keyboardist Emmett Elvin recently joined. More recently Sam Warren (Tunguska Butterfly, Thumpermonkey) has joined on bass.

Adapted from AllMusic.

Current members

- David J. Smith – drums (1994–present)
- Kavus Torabi – guitar (2006–present)
- Emmett Elvin – keyboards (?–present)
- Sam Warren – bass (2015–present)

Former members

- Matt Thompson – bass, guitar (left 2005)
- Rojer Macoustra – bass (1994–1996)
- Pid – bass (1996–1997)
- Caroline Kraabel – saxophone (1999–2000)
- Daniel O'Sullivan – keyboard (2003–?)
- James Sedwards – bass (2006–2015)

Live members

- David Ledden – bass (2005–2006)

== Discography ==
=== Albums ===
- 1997 Towers Open Fire CD (Power Tool Records)
- 1998 Hirohito CD (Pandemonium Records)
- 2001 Great Sage, Equal of Heaven CD (Pandemonium/Tumult)
- 2004 Five Suns CD (Cuneiform Records)
- 2005 Black Oni CD (Ipecac Recordings) – produced by Jaime Gomez Arellano (limited-edition LP version released 2007 on Hlava Records)
- 2008 Elixirs CD (Neurot Recordings)
- 2013 History of the Visitation CD + DVD (Cuneiform Records)
- 2015 Obscure Knowledge (Cuneiform Records)

=== EPs and singles ===
- 1995 Hell is Other People EP (Power Tool Records)
- 1996 Guapo is No More EP (Power Tool Records)
- 1997 Horse Walks Into a Bar EP (Power Tool Records)
- 1998 Guapo vs. Magma EP (Pandemonium Records)
- 2006 Twisted Stems limited edition 7" single (Dot Dot Dot Music)
- 2006 Twisted Stems CDEP (Aurora Borealis)

== Discography (collaborations) ==
=== with Ruins and The Shock Exchange ===
- 2000 Death Seed CD (Freeland Records)

=== with Cerberus Shoal ===
- 2003 The Ducks and Drakes of Guapo and Cerberus Shoal CD (North East Indie Records)

== See also ==
- Romantic Warriors II: A Progressive Music Saga About Rock in Opposition
