= Akiko Matsuura =

Japanese drummer and vocalist working in the UK

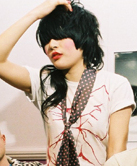
- Akiko Matsuura (c.2006)

Background information
- Origin: Osaka, Japan
- Genres: Punk rock, noise rock, experimental rock, avant-garde
- Instruments: vocals, drums, guitar
- Labels: Skin Graft; Merok; Forcefield

Akiko Matsuura (also known by the name Keex) is a Japanese drummer and vocalist residing in the United Kingdom. She has worked in numerous bands in the UK.

== Career ==
Matsuura is the front woman of the British art rock band PRE. Matsuura has worked with numerous bands, including as the front woman for Comanechi with guitarist Simon Petrovich. Matsuura played drums with The Big Pink and has a side project called Sperm Javelin.

Matsuura met her partners in The Big Pink while attending art school in London; they were all well known in the London punk and noise rock scene. She has also played with the Glasgow band Divorce.

== Personal life ==
Matsuura was formerly in a relationship with British actor Charlie Heaton. Together they have a son who was born in 2014. At the time of the child’s birth, Heaton was 20 and Matsuura was 34.

== See also ==
- Women in punk rock
