= Daniel O'Sullivan (musician) =

British musician

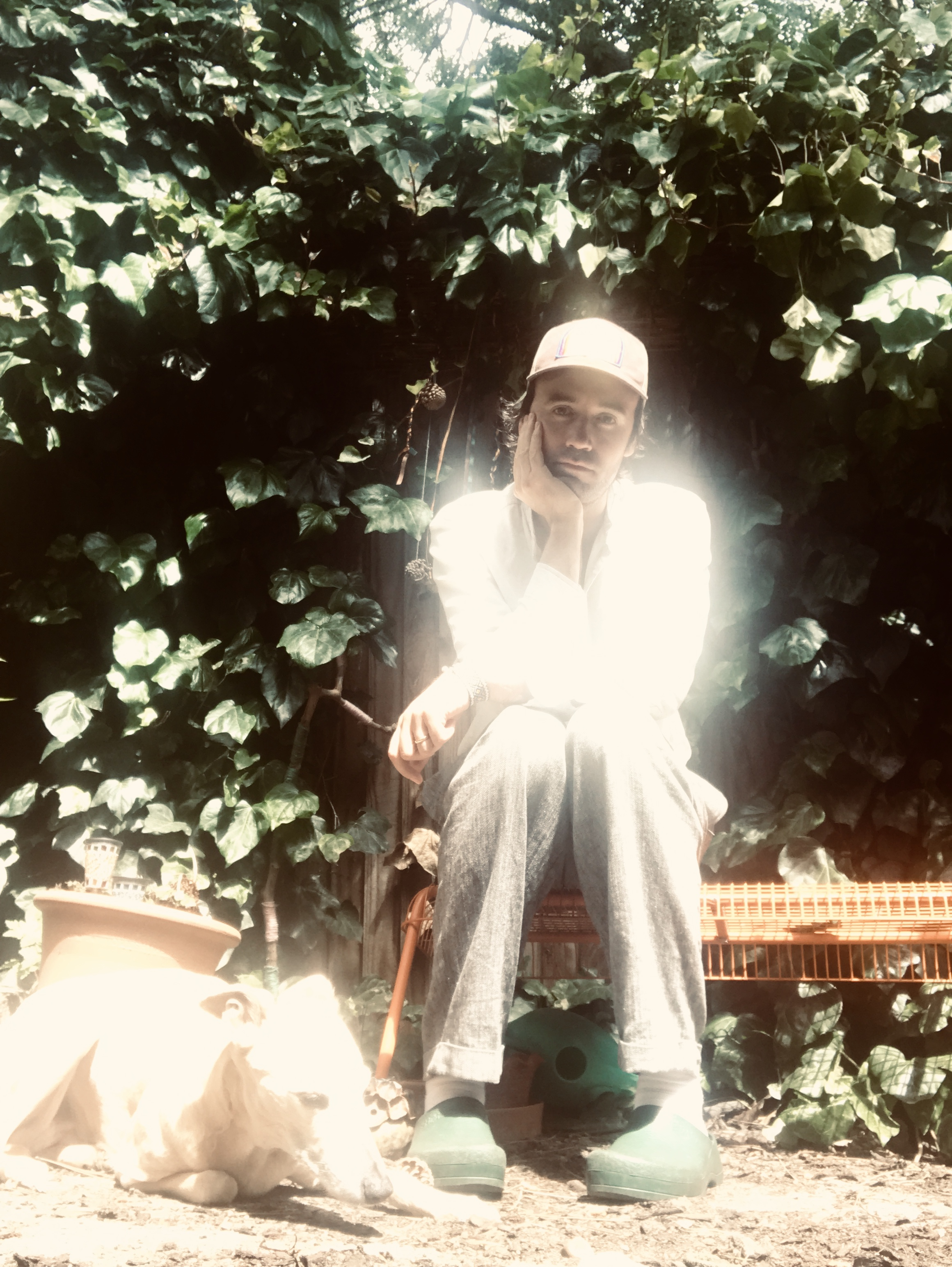

Background information
- Born: 1 December 1980 (age 45)
- Genres: Experimental rock, art rock, progressive rock, electronic, avant-garde, ambient, synthpop
- Occupations: Musician, composer, songwriter, record producer
- Instruments: Vocals, piano, keyboards, programming, guitar, bass, violin
- Years active: 1990s-present
- Labels: Ipecac Recordings, Cuneiform, Thrill Jockey, Kscope, Neurot Recordings, Web of Mimicry, VHF, House Anxiety Records, O Genesis

Daniel O'Sullivan (born 1 December 1980) is an English musician, composer and producer from Manchester, best known for playing or having played in experimental art-rock bands Grumbling Fur, Guapo, Miasma & the Carousel of Headless Horses, Ulver, Sunn O))), Æthenor, Laniakea, Miracle, Mothlite, and This Is Not This Heat. He has also released solo work under his own name.

O'Sullivan is recognized for exploring a wide range of styles, including neo-classical composition, progressive/psychedelic rock, free-form improvisation, cosmic jazz, minimalist drone, ethereal synth-pop and outer-limits folk music.

== Career ==
O'Sullivan has collaborated with a number of artists including Richard Youngs, Charlemagne Palestine, Stephen O'Malley (also a member of Æthenor), Alexander Tucker, Oren Marshall, Peter Broderick, Oren Ambarchi, Tim Burgess, Jarboe and David Tibet.

He has been a live member of Sunn O))) and joined cult Norwegian band Ulver in 2010, as announced by the band on the official Ulver website, "Lastly we would like to welcome Daniel O'Sullivan into the pack. We all know that God exists as three persons, but now is the dawn of the triangular pyramid." O'Sullivan has been performing live with Ulver since the band's first performance in fifteen years at the Norwegian Festival of Literature 2009 in Lillehammer.

In 2011, O'Sullivan released an EP with his new band Miracle, a synth-pop duo also featuring Steve Moore from Zombi. Their debut full-length album, Mercury, was released in October 2013. Their second album The Strife of Love in a Dream will be released in February 2018.

Another new project, this time with regular collaborator Alexander Tucker, has emerged with the name Grumbling Fur. The debut album Furrier also features Jussi Lehtisalo from Finnish bands Circle and Pharaoh Overlord and David Smith from Guapo. Following the session EP Alice, the duo released their second album Glynnaestra on the Chicago-based label Thrill Jockey. It was ranked No. 1 album of 2013 by The Quietus and featured in the Top 50 of several magazines including Wire and Fact. Grumbling Fur released their third album, Preternaturals, on The Quietus's Phonographic Corporation imprint in August 2014. Their fourth album, Furfour, was released in 2016 on Thrill Jockey. Under the name Grumbling Fur Time Machine Orchestra, the duo has also released two collaborative recordings with Charlemagne Palestine in 2015 and 2017, both being limited vinyl editions.

O'Sullivan released a solo album titled VELD in June 2017 on O Genesis Recordings. It was written and recorded between 2010 and 2016. His second solo album Folly appeared in 2019, followed by 2023's Rosarium, which was mixed by Thighpaulsandra.

His first book of visual artworks, The Shell is A Cell, was released in 2024.

O’Sullivan has also notably produced the last two solo albums for The Charlatans frontman, Tim Burgess,

== Discography ==
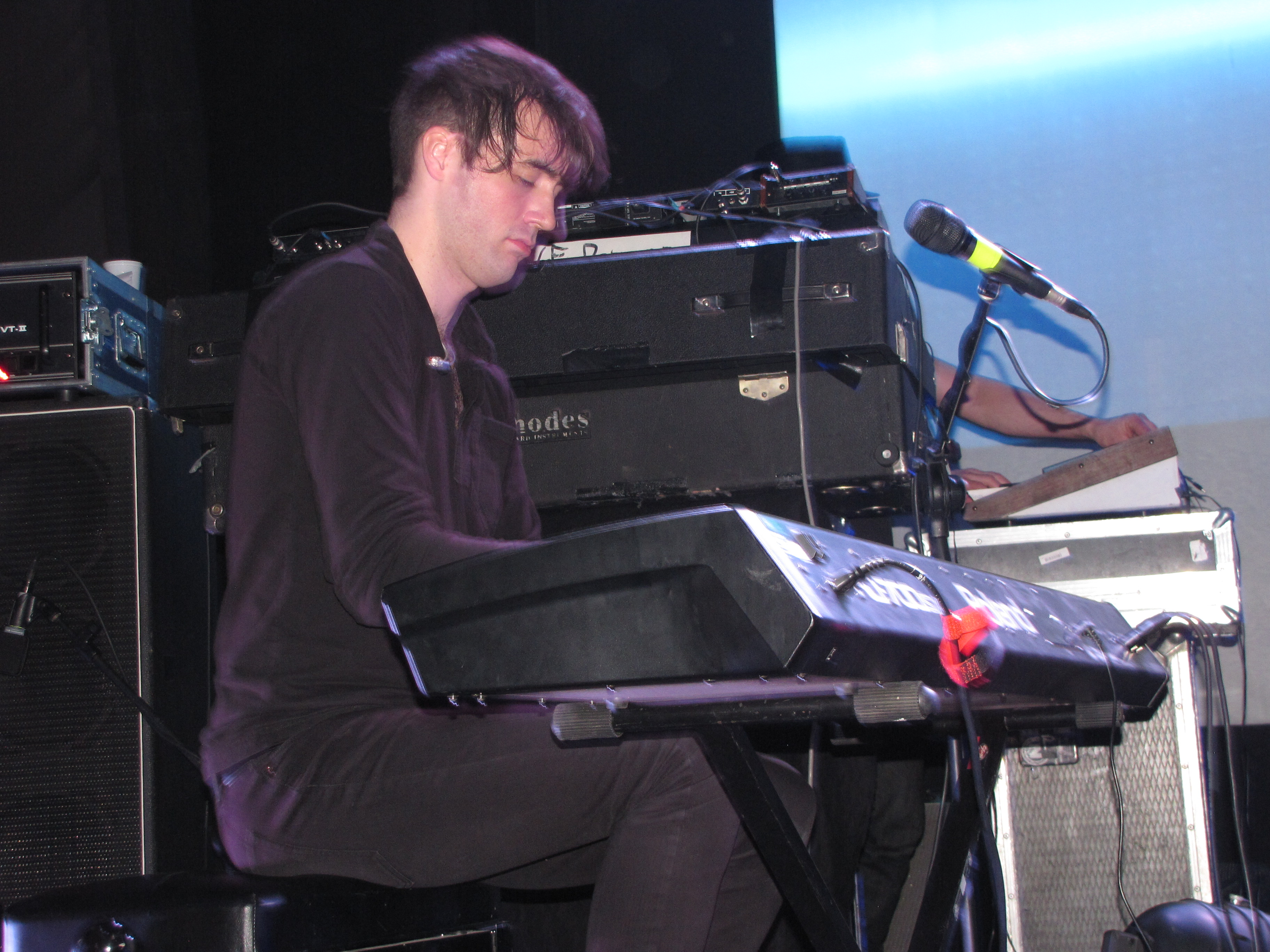
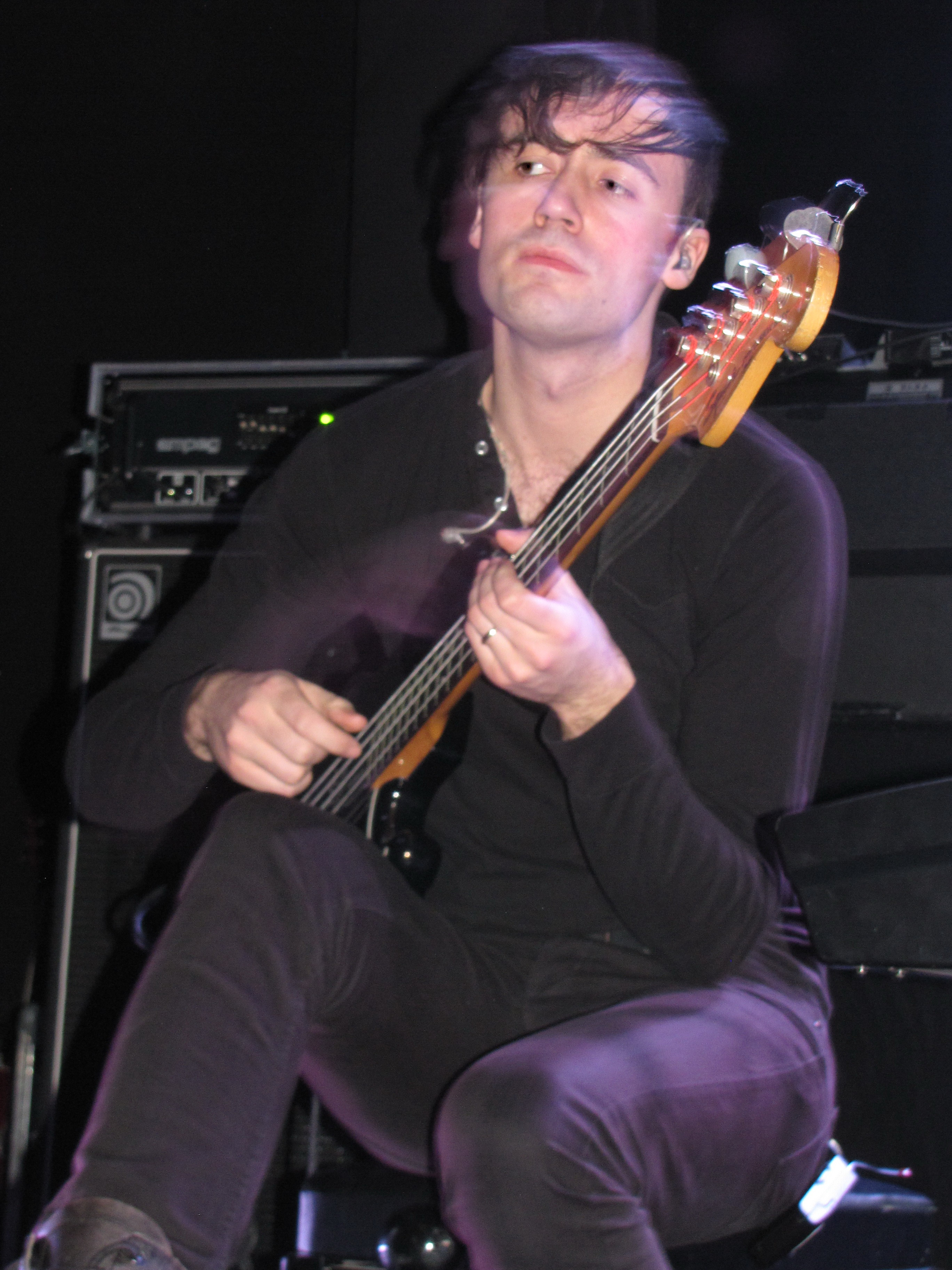
O'Sullivan performing with Ulver in 2010

=== Guapo ===
- 2003 The Ducks and Drakes of Guapo and Cerberus Shoal CD (North East Indie)
- 2004 Five Suns CD (Cuneiform Records)
- 2005 Black Oni CD (Ipecac Records)
- 2006 Twisted Stems Limited Edition 7" (Dot Dot Dot Music)
- 2006 Twisted Stems CDEP (Aurora Borealis)
- 2007 Black Oni Limited Edition LP (Hlava Records)
- 2008 Elixirs CD (Neurot Recordings)

=== Miasma & The Carousel of Headless Horses ===
- 2005 Perils CD (Web of Mimicry)
- 2007 Perils LP (Rise Above Records)
- 2007 Manfauna CDEP (Southern Records/Latitudes)
- 2008 Manfauna 12"EP (Southern Records/Latitudes)

=== Æthenor ===
- 2006 Deep in Ocean Sunk the Lamp of Light CD/LP (VHF Records)
- 2008 Betimes Black Cloudmasses CD/LP (VHF Records)
- 2009 Faking Gold & Murder CD/LP (VHF Records)
- 2011 En Form for Blå CD/2xLP (VHF Records)

=== Mothlite ===
- 2008 The Flax of Reverie CD/LP (Southern Records)
- 2012 Dark Age CD/LP (Kscope)
- 2013 Mathair 10"EP (Kscope)

=== Ulver ===
- 2011 Wars of the Roses CD/LP (Kscope)
- 2012 The Norwegian National Opera DVD/Blu-Ray (Kscope)
- 2012 Childhood's End CD/LP (Kscope)
- 2016 ATGCLVLSSCAP CD/LP (House of Mythology)

=== Sunn O))) & Ulver ===
- 2014 Terrestrials CD/LP (Southern Lord)

=== Miracle ===
- 2011 Fluid Window CDEP/12" (House Anxiety Records)
- 2011 The Visitors 2x12"EP (House Anxiety Records)
- 2012 Good Love/Veteran of the Psychic Wars 7" (House Anxiety Records)
- 2013 Mercury CD/LP (Planet Mu)
- 2018 The Strife of Love in a Dream CD/LP (Relapse Records)
- 2026 The Living Likeness Of My Electric Daemon CD/LP (Relapse Records)

=== Grumbling Fur ===
- 2011 Furrier CD/LP (Aurora Borealis)
- 2012 Alice CDEP/LP (Southern Records/Latitudes)
- 2013 Glynnaestra CD/LP (Thrill Jockey)
- 2014 Preternaturals CD/LP (Phonographic Corporation)
- 2016 Furfour CD/LP (Thrill Jockey)

=== Charlemagne Palestine and the Grumbling Fur Time Machine Orchestra ===
- 2015 Ggrrreeebbbaaammmnnnuuuccckkkaaaiiioooww!!! LP (Important Records)
- 2017 Omminggg and Schlomminggg LP (Important Records)

=== Astral Social Club & Grumbling Fur Time Machine Orchestra ===
- 2019 Plasma Splice Trifle LP (VHF Records)

=== Daniel O'Sullivan and Serena Korda ===
- 2011 Laid to Rest: The Brick Keepers LP (UP Projects/Wellcome Collection)
- 2012 W.A.M.A: The Work as Movement Archive CD (Field Art Projects)

=== Daniel O'Sullivan & Richard Youngs ===
- 2020 Twelve Of Hearts LP (O Genesis)
- 2026 Persian Carpets LP (VHF Records)

=== Daniel O'Sullivan ===
- 2017 VELD CD/LP (O Genesis)
- 2018 The Physic Garden LP (KPM 2059)
- 2019 Folly CD/LP (O Genesis)
- 2020 The Colour of Entropy (In Three Stages) LP (Sleeperhold Publications)
- 2020 Electric Māyā: Dream Flotsam and Astral Hinterlands LP (VHF Records)
- 2021 Fourth Density LP (VHF Records)
- 2023 The Physic Garden LP (VHF Records)
- 2023 Rosarium CD/LP (House of Mythology)
- 2024 The Pastoral Machine LP (VHF Records)
- 2025 Eros LP (Be With Records)

== Guest appearances ==
=== The Big Pink ===
- 2009 A Brief History of Love CD/LP (4AD)
- 2012 Future This CD/LP (4AD)

=== Alexander Tucker ===
- 2011 Dorwytch CD/LP (Thrill Jockey)
- 2012 Third Mouth CD/LP (Thrill Jockey)

=== Chrome Hoof ===
- 2007 Pre-Emptive False Rapture CD/LP (Southern Records)
- 2010 Crush Depth CD/LP (Southern Records)
- 2013 Chrome Black Gold CD/LP (Cuneiform Records)

=== The Stargazer's Assistant ===
- 2007 The Other Side of the Island CD (Aurora Borealis)

=== Dam ===
- 2007 The Difference Engine CD (Candlelight Records)

=== Panda Bear & Sonic Boom ===
- 2026 A ? of WHEN CD/LP (Domino Recording Company)
