= La Abadía del Crimen =

1987 video game

La abadía del crimen
- Developer: Opera Soft
- Publisher: Opera Soft
- Designer: Paco Menéndez
- Artist: Juan Delcán
- Platforms: Amstrad CPC, MSX, MS-DOS, ZX Spectrum
- Release: 1987
- Genre: Adventure
- Mode: Single-player

La Abadía del Crimen (The Abbey of Crime) is a video game written by Paco Menéndez with graphics made by Juan Delcán and published in 1987 by Opera Soft. It was conceived as a version of Umberto Eco's 1980 book The Name of the Rose. Paco Menéndez and Opera Soft were unable to secure the rights for the name, so the game was released as La abadía del crimen. "The Abbey of the Crime" was the working title of the novel The Name of the Rose.

This game is an adventure with isometric graphics. A Franciscan friar, William of Occam (William of Baskerville in the book) and his young novice Adso have to discover the perpetrator of a series of murders in a medieval Italian abbey.

== Gameplay ==
The main characters: Guillermo Adso and the Abbot (Amstrad screenshot)

The player controls the movement of the friar Fra William (mistakenly described as a monk in the user manual). The player also has the possibility of controlling the movement of the novice Adso within the same screen in which Fra William is. If the key for controlling the novice is not pressed, he follows Fra William most of the time. The game features other characters representing the monks of the abbey who behave according to programmed artificial intelligence to move throughout the mapping of the abbey and show a series of dialogs shown by written text which is moved along the lower part of the screen.

An extensive mapping of the abbey is represented in a large series of screens with 3D isometric graphics. A series of objects has to be collected in order to successfully complete the game. The action occurs in seven days subdivided in different Canonical hours. The time (day + current hour) is indicated at the bottom left of the screen.

The game starts with the abbot welcoming Fra William and explaining that a monk has disappeared. He also explains to Fra William that he is obligated to obey the orders of the abbot and the rules of the monastery, attend religious services and meals and stay in his cell at night while the research of the crimes is pursued. During the game, the novice Adso would remind players when they have to attend offices and meals, and players can just follow him if they forget the way to the church or the refectory.

If the player disobeys any orders, or is late for services or meals, then their obsequium level, indicated on the bottom right-hand-side of the screen, will drop (obsequium is Latin for subservience or obedience). If the player's obsequium level drops to zero, the abbot will not tolerate their disrespect any longer, and the player is asked to leave the abbey, while missing a prayer office or being caught wandering around at night results in immediate expulsion - both mean that the game is over.

== Ports ==
The game was originally developed for the Amstrad CPC 6128 8-bit platform and ported to other systems: ZX Spectrum, MSX, and MS-DOS. The Amstrad CPC 464 version was different from the 6128 original, since several rooms and decoration were removed to fit the game on the 64K of the 464.

The only ZX Spectrum version is for the 128 platform.

== Features ==
The music played in the game corresponds to the Minuet in G major and the sonata for flute BWV 1033 by Bach, and Crystal Palace from Gwendal. The original PC version also featured "Ave Maria" from Schubert, in a short chorus recording that played through the speaker when the player went to the church.

There is also a form of copy protection: if an illegal copy of the game was detected, then once the player entered the church, instead of "Ave Maria" playing, a voice would cry "¡Pirata!" (Spanish for "pirate") ten times in descending tones before the game crashed.

== Reception ==
The game had a modest commercial success and was never officially released outside of Spain, a country where it came to achieve a cult following. The game is considered one of the perfect ten games for the Spectrum 128 according to Retro Gamer.

The game was referenced on a Spanish postal stamp.

== Legacy ==
=== Port ===
- Microsoft Windows version from the original MS-DOS version with 256 colour graphics and translations.
- MSX2 version from the original MSX version adding a 16-colour palette and load/save from the disk.
- Amstrad PCW version from the original Amstrad CPC version.

=== Remakes ===
- Game Boy Advance version
- J2ME commercial version
- A complete disassembly of the original Z80 code for the Amstrad CPC and a rewrite of it in C++ was made by Manuel Abadia (Vigasoco project).
  - There is a Simple DirectMedia Layer (SDL) port of Vigasoco that runs on Linux-x86, Linux-PowerPC (PS3), PS2, Windows XP, Mac OS X, Dreamcast, Google Native Client and WebAssembly.
    - VigasocoSDL patches to run on RG350 (Anbernic), and Android.
  - Vigasoco is translated to Java and GWT and runs on web browsers.
  - Several ports were based on disassembly of the original.
    - Swift version to run on iOS devices.
    - Visual Basic (unfinished)
    - JavaScript version (with logic errors)
    - VB.net
- Java version
- The Abbey of Crime Extensum, extended J2SE edition, available for free on Steam.

== See also ==
- Golden era of Spanish software
