= I Am... (Beyoncé tour) =

2009–2010 concert tour by Beyoncé

I Am... Tour
- World tour by Beyoncé
- Location: Africa; Asia; Europe; North America; Oceania; South America
- Associated album: I Am... Sasha Fierce
- Start date: March 26, 2009
- End date: February 18, 2010
- No. of shows: 103
- Attendance: 1,214,842 (96 shows)
- Box office: $119.5 million ($176.43 million in 2025 dollars)

Beyoncé concert chronology
- The Beyoncé Experience (2007); I Am... Tour (2009–10); I Am... Yours (2009)

I Am... Tour (also referred to as the I Am... World Tour) was the fourth concert tour by American singer-songwriter Beyoncé, in support of her third studio album, I Am... Sasha Fierce (2008), consisting of 110 concerts across six continents. Two months of preparations for the tour began eight months prior to its commencement, with daily twelve-hour rehearsals. The tour was announced in October 2008, and began in March 2009 with five preliminary ’rehearsal’ shows in North America. Beyoncé has described the I Am... World Tour as her best and most theatrical of all of her tours.

The set list for the tour included songs from Beyoncé's previous three studio albums, several covers of songs by other artists, as well as a Destiny's Child medley. The central theme of the tour was to showcase the differences between Beyoncé's dual ‘personas’—her real, ‘Beyoncé's self compared to her confident, sexier stage-persona, ‘Sasha Fierce’—a theme which was also explored on her then-album, the dual record I Am... Sasha Fierce. The show featured two stages – the primary performance stage and a smaller B-stage, which Beyoncé was transferred to during the middle of the show. She was backed by a ten-member, all-female band, The Sugar Mamas (also known as Suga Mama), female background dancers, and a large LED video screen. Thierry Mugler collaborated with Beyoncé on the costumes and was given a creative-advisor role, further collaborating on choreography, lighting and production. Chris March made the costumes usable and wearable for the stage and helped in their construction. For the ballad performances, Beyoncé wore longer, glamorous dresses; for the performances of up-tempo songs, more make-up was applied and more revealing outfits were worn. The fashion, as well as Beyoncé's looks and overall physique, received notable praise from critics and fans. The show was directed and choreographed by Frank Gatson Jr.

I Am... received critical acclaim from music journalists and fans alike, with many praising Beyoncé's performance skills and calling her the “best” current female performer. A concert in Malaysia, however, was cancelled by Beyoncé herself, after several Muslim groups tried to ban it on the grounds of revealing costumes—despite it being a family-friendly show, and Beyoncé having originally agreed to tone-down her looks, as per the country's standards. Nevertheless, the entire tour was commercially successful, grossing $86.0 million from the first 93 shows in total. Separate and one-off performances of several songs were broadcast on different channels; two concerts were released as live albums, and the live performance at the I Am... Yours revue was released as a CD/DVD recording (2009). Footage of the tour was released on a similarly titled live album (2010).

== Background ==
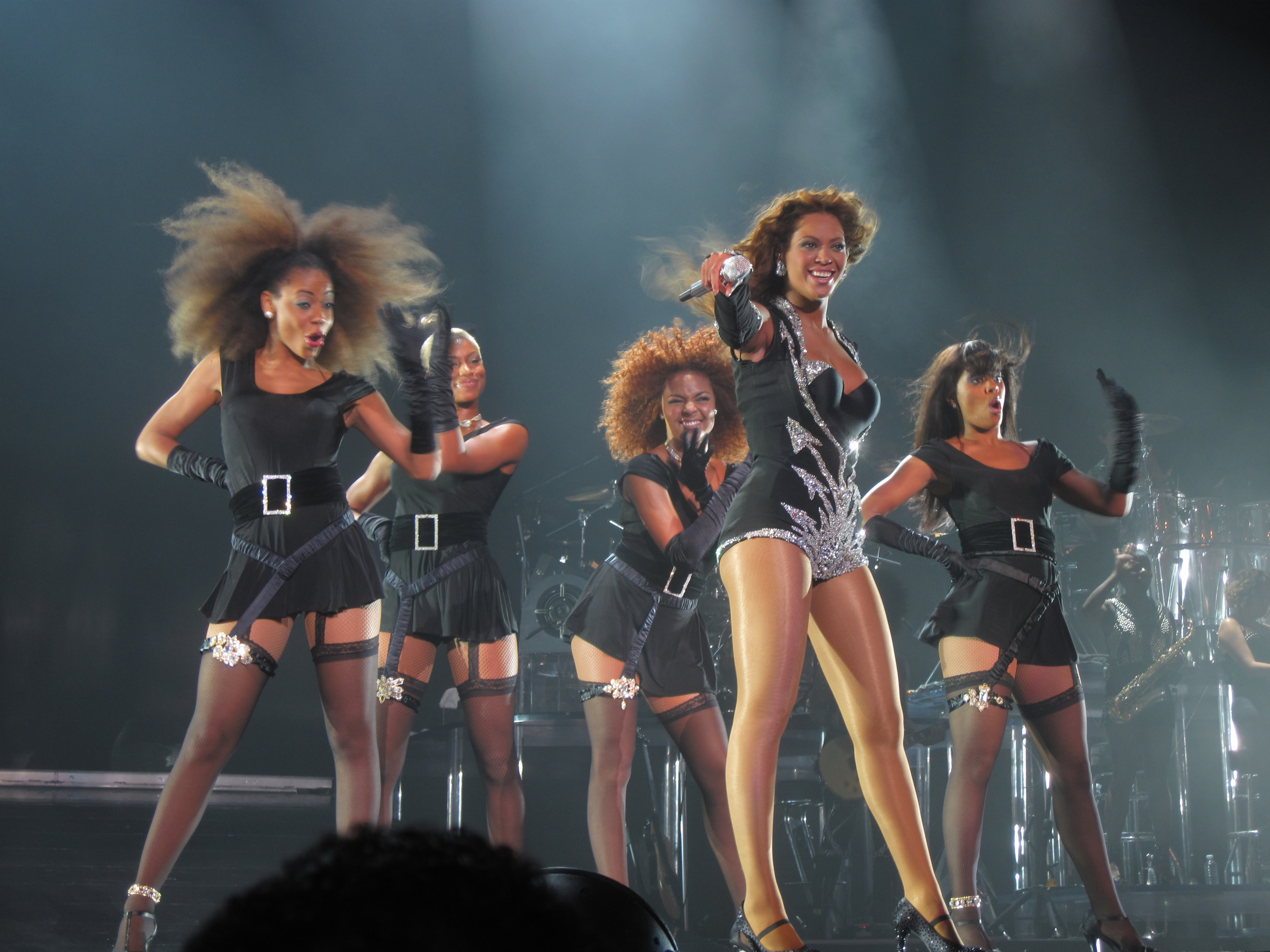
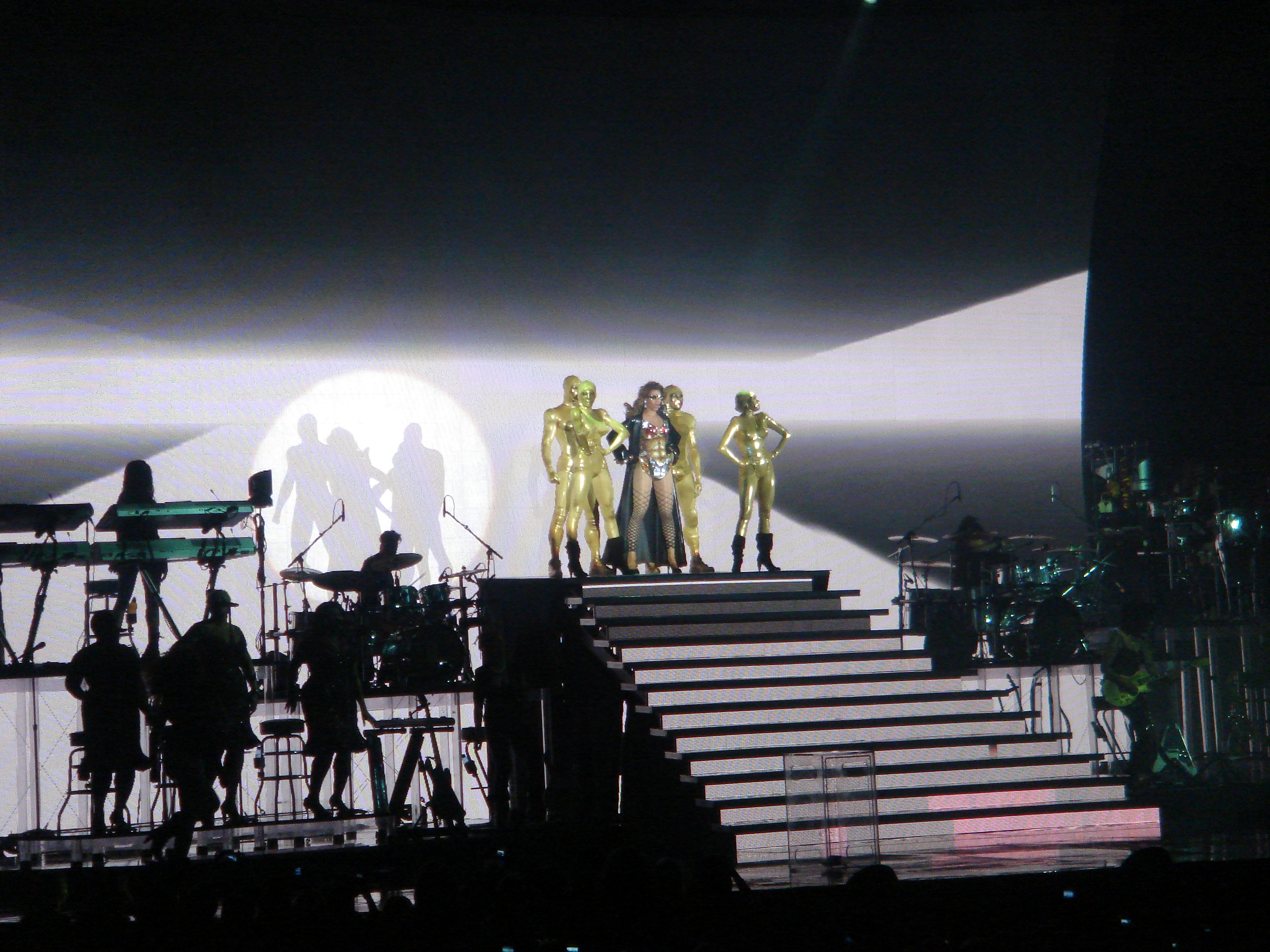
Knowles performing "Single Ladies (Put a Ring on It)" (left) and "Diva" (right) during the I Am... tour while being backed by dancers. Both songs were part of the Sasha Fierce disc on the double album I Am... Sasha Fierce which was dedicated to her eponymous alter ego.

In 2006, during an interview with MTV News, Beyoncé introduced an aggressive alter ego, Sasha Fierce, which also served as her stage persona. She added that the persona is a complete opposite of her when not performing by characterizing her as "aggressive... strong... fearless." Beyoncé'ss third album I Am... Sasha Fierce introduced Sasha Fierce as her alter ego. she revealed that Sasha was born during the making of her single "Crazy in Love" (2003). The plans for a 2009 tour in support of the album were announced in October 2008 by Billboard magazine. The tour dates for the European leg were announced in December 2008. During an interview with Entertainment Weekly, Beyoncé confirmed that she would be backed by the all-female band which had also accompanied her for her previous The Beyoncé Experience tour (2007). Rehearsals for the tour lasted eight months during which the set list for the shows was also constructed. Beyoncé further revealed that the twelve-hour rehearsals for the tour included dancing the choreography in heels for two months before it commenced. During an interview, Beyoncé emphasized how she needed to prepare to channel her alter ego for the performances. According to Beyoncé, the shows were supposed to be a mixture of several of her musical preferences, including jazz, hip-hop, ballet and fashion.

The tour kicked off in late-March 2009 with five rehearsal shows in North America. It officially commenced in late April 2009, at Arena Zagreb in Croatia later visiting six continents, namely the Americas, Europe, Asia, Africa, and Australia. The six-week North American leg of the I Am... tour kicked off on June 21 with a show at Madison Square Garden in New York and finished with a four-night residency at Encore in the Wynn Las Vegas from July 30, 2009 to August 2, 2009. The tour finished with a concert at Queen's Park Savannah in Port of Spain, Trinidad and Tobago, with 103 shows in total. Beyoncé and her organization, The Survivor Foundation, became the spokesperson for General Mills' Hamburger Helper campaign entitled, "Show Your Helping Hand". The campaign's mission was to provide more than 3.5 million meals to local food banks in North America. Beyoncé encouraged spectators to bring non-perishable foods to her North American concerts to be donated to the campaign. According to the campaign's official website, nearly three millions meals and over $50,000 have been donated.

== Development ==
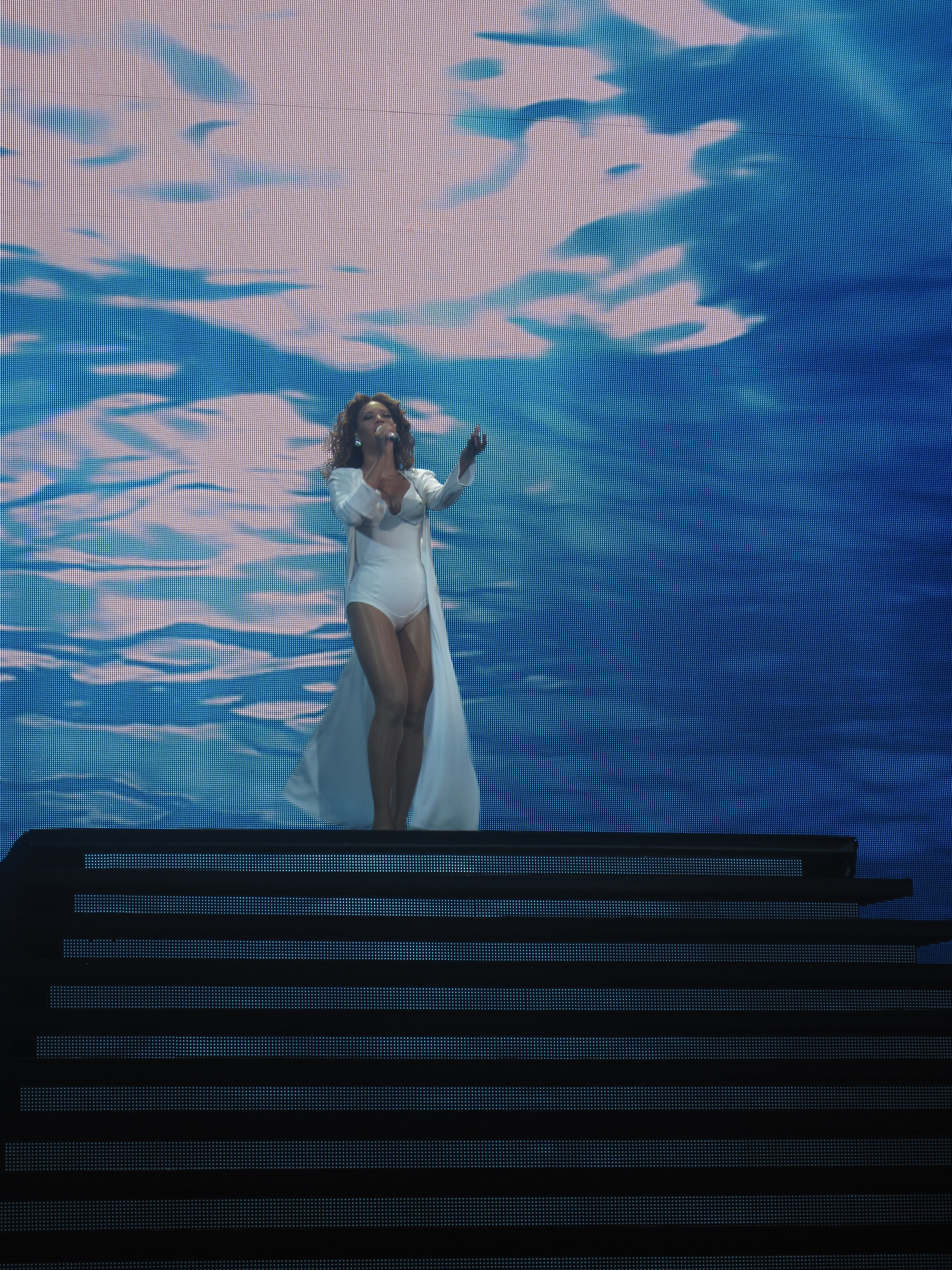
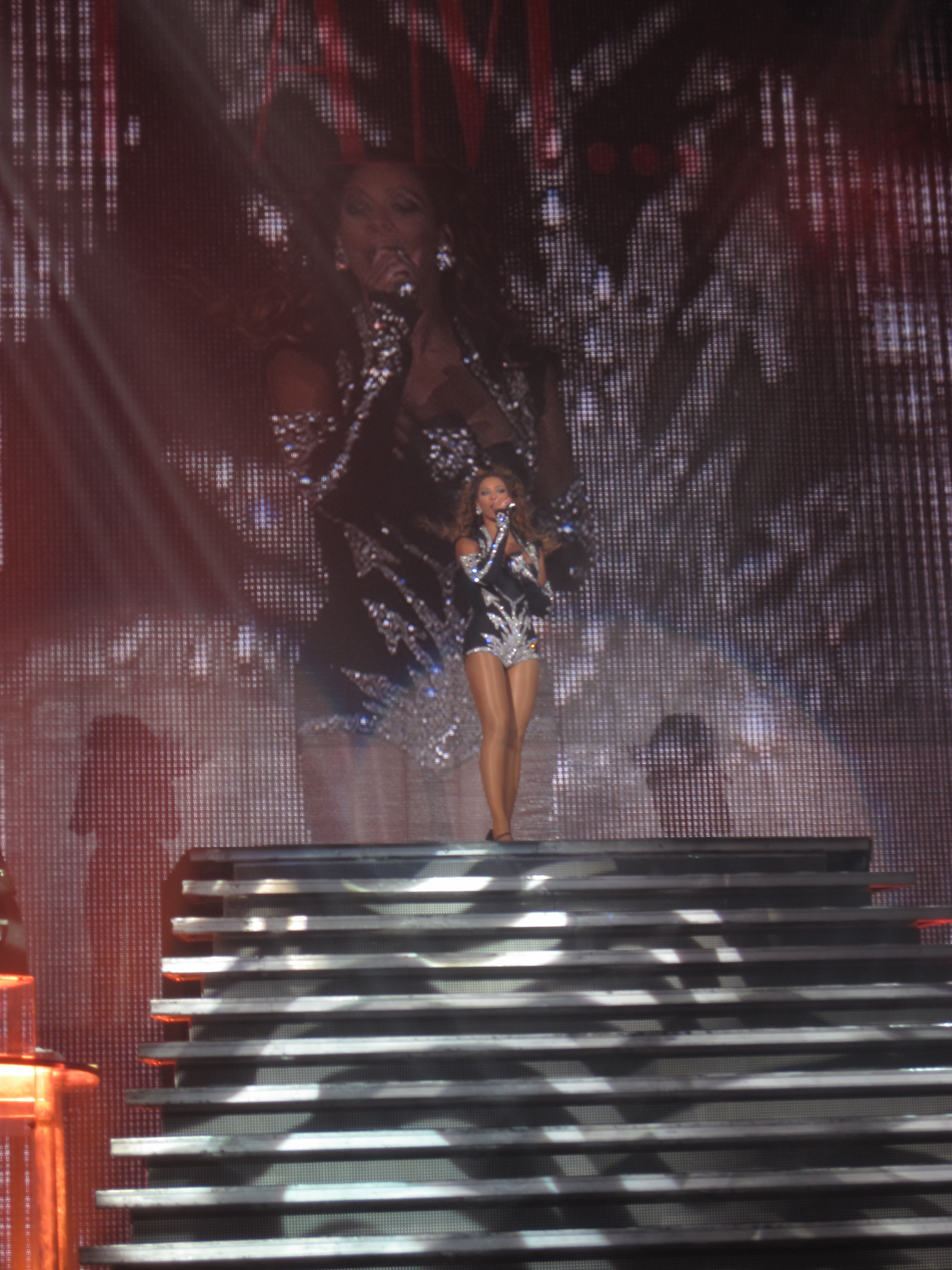
Knowles performing "Smash Into You" (left) and "Halo" (right) during a stop of the I Am... tour at The O_{2} Arena in London. The performances saw her singing the songs on a staircase which was the largest piece of equipment on stage.

Beyoncé revealed that the hardest aspect of coming up with the tour's set list was managing to fit her decade-long song catalogue in a two-hour show. According to her, the tour was supposed to be more emotional than The Beyoncé Experience in order to reflect the "real[,] raw and more sensitive" nature of the I Am... portion of the double album. Beyoncé expressed frustration that snippets of the show appeared online after the first shows on the opening leg, thus "ruining" the surprise factor of the concert experience; however she also appreciated the fact that it can act as a "little sneak peek" for fans to decide if they indeed want to attend. French designer Thierry Mugler served as the creative advisor while also being responsible for Beyoncé'ss wardrobe. He contributed in the design of lighting, choreography, production and directed three sequences for the concert. According to his creative vision, the shows were intended to represent mise-en-scène by incorporating technical aspects with fashion in order to capture the emotions behind the songs. He added, "There will be a lot of dramatization and metamorphosis on stage. Some very strong effects have been inspired directly by Beyoncé, and only she could make [them] happen on stage."

Onstage, Beyoncé was backed by her ten-piece all-female band, Suga Mama, which included two drummers, two keyboardists, a percussionist, a horn section, three backup vocalists called the Mamas, and a lead guitarist. The show featured two stages, namely a simple main stage with a pop-up set of stairs, an LED background screen, and glass risers for Suga Mama and The Mamas as well as a smaller B-stage in the midst of the audience for the later portions of the show. During the concerts, Beyoncé went through six costume changes; during the breaks, The Mamas harmonized. The set list included songs from all of Beyoncé'ss three studio albums that had been published, a Destiny's Child medley and several covers of other artists. Several critics noted that the songs on the set list were divided into ballads and more up-tempo songs to coincide with the central theme of I Am... Sasha Fierce – the dual personality of Beyoncé. Beyoncé'ss costumes were changed in order to coincide with the songs' nature; during performances of ballads, she wore longer white dresses while for the uptempo songs, she had more revealing outfits and make-up.

== Fashion ==
Thierry Mugler design sketches for the wardrobe of the I Am... tour. The words "Feminine. Free. Warrior. Fierce" were used as inspiration for the look during the concerts.

Thierry Mugler served as the main costume designer for the tour. Beyoncé was acquainted to and enraptured by his work at the Metropolitan Museum of Art Costume Institute Gala, titled "Superheroes, Fashion and Fantasy" (2008) where she saw several of his haute couture pieces that were on display. Beyoncé discussed the possibility of using the costumes with Tina Knowles. She met with Mugler in Paris in September of the same year and started exchanging ideas for costume designs and the following month he was contracted as the designer for the tour. While designing, the main concept Mugler wanted to illustrate was the duality between "being a woman and a warrior" through his own creative perception; the words "Feminine. Free. Warrior. Fierce" were the overarching inspiration. He felt, "Sasha Fierce is another aspect of Beyoncé'ss personality, she is Fierce on stage and Beyoncé in real life... Beyoncé is a very sophisticated 'stage animal', which means that she is truly instinctive. Beyoncé expresses herself through the two aspects of her personality." Furthermore, the elaborate costumes were related to the meanings of the songs performed.

A seventy one piece wardrobe was designed for Beyoncé and her dancers and band. For the shows, Beyoncé adopted ten different looks. American fashion designer Chris March also worked with Mugler ensuring the costumes were suitable for stage purposes. On July 23, 2009, March filed a lawsuit against Mugler for allegedly not paying him for the work he did on the wardrobe. Metal pieces, fishnets, gloves, power shoulders and golden leotards were all incorporated in the costumes, the majority of which were form-fitting and exposed the singer's legs. Michael Quintanilla of San Antonio Express-News thought the fashion was akin to a "high-tech Blade Runner world". For the performance of several songs, Beyoncé also wore leopard-print pants and glow-in-the-dark bra with a blinking beacon affixed to her body.

The fashion and Beyoncé'ss look during the shows received praise from critics. Randall King of the Winnipeg Free Press noted that the fashion was inspired by "1970s space movie" fashion by Bob Mackie. Alice Jones of The Independent noted: "[the list of] 30 songs introduces us to any number of different Beyoncés – showgirl, balladeer, feminist, rock chick, gangster queen, cyborg – via off-stage costume changes and a leotard for every mood". Kathy McCabe of The Daily Telegraph noted that the shows featured "some of the most elaborate and revealing costumes of her career" thus far. A writer of the Evening Chronicle wrote that the sparkling outfits managed to capture the singer's personality with looks ranging from "NYPD cop to bride to Wonderwoman and beyond" all the while emphasizing her physique. Holly Burnes of The Daily Telegraph also praised the fashion writing that the singer's look included "one incredible costume after another: from a Mad Max look... to an angelic wedding dress Jay Hanna of The Sunday Times compared Beyoncé'ss look to a goddess, particularly with the costume she wore for "Single Ladies (Put a Ring on It)".

== Concert synopsis ==
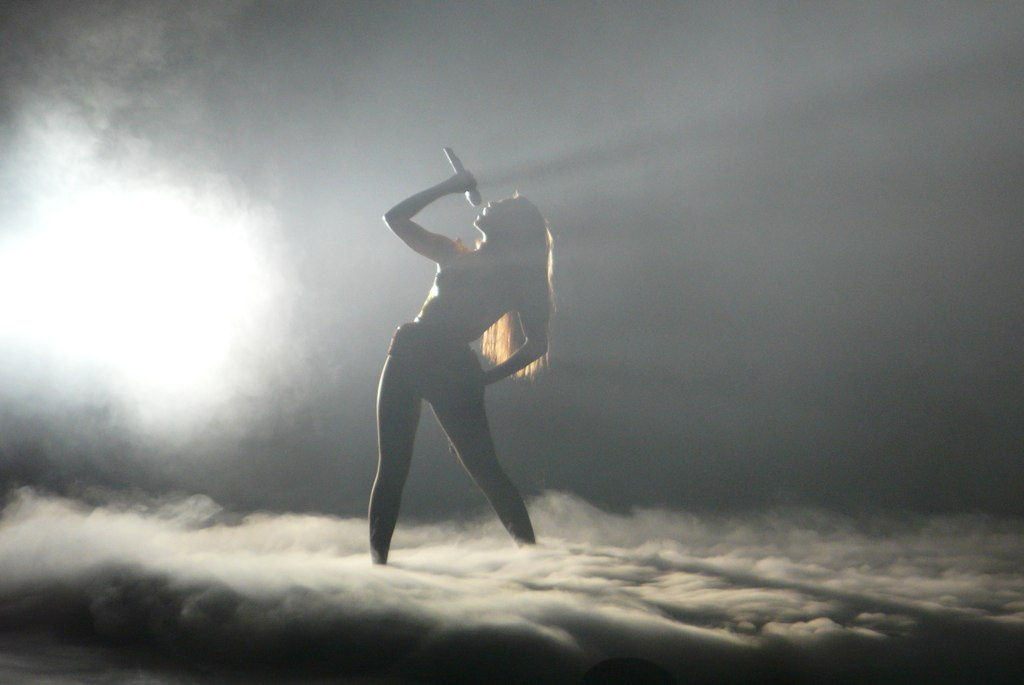
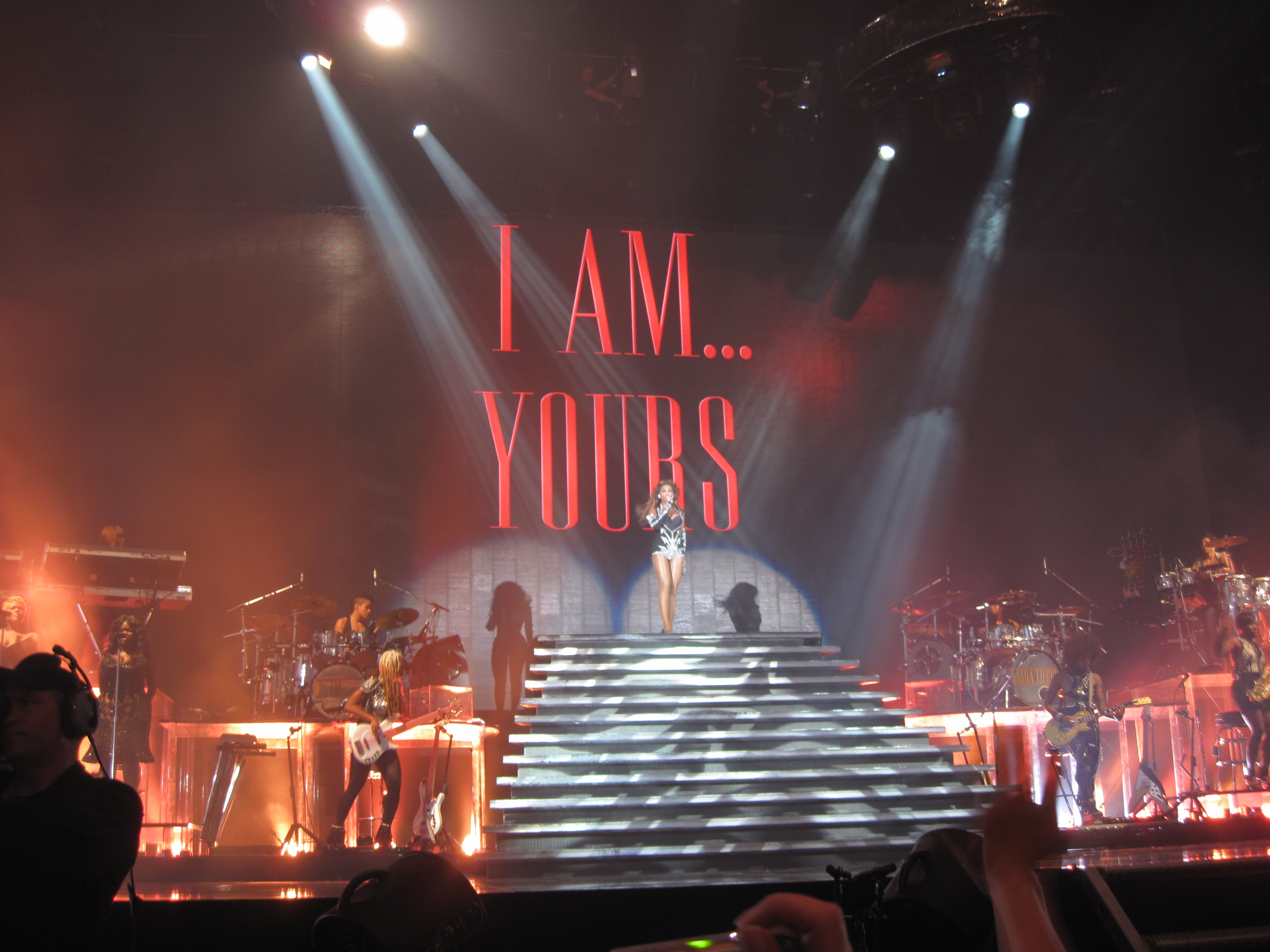
Beyoncé pictured during the opening and the closing sequence of the show. During the beginning of the concert, she appeared on stage surrounded by smoke and struck a pose in silhouette (left). The final of the show saw Knowles on top of a staircase repeatedly saying "I am", awaiting the crowd to say it back (right).

The show started with Beyoncé'ss silhouette appearing on a smoky stage, walking towards the front while singing several lines of "Déjà Vu". Dressed in a gold leotard and stilettos, she was quickly joined by two dancers in catsuits proceeding to perform "Crazy in Love"; during the performance of the song glitter and confetti were dropped on stage. "Naughty Girl" was performed next as bright orange lights were displayed on stage. For the performance of "Freakum Dress", Beyoncé was accompanied by a guitarist onstage, bending backwards during the song's bridge. "Get Me Bodied" followed, for which the singer was engaging in elaborate dance routines with her background dancers. Following a short break, Beyoncé proceeded singing songs from the I Am... portion of the album, dressed in a white leotard. "Smash Into You" was performed on top of a flight of stairs. For "Ave Maria", her background dancers turned her white dress into a wedding gown by attaching a veil to her head. Excerpts of Sarah McLachlan's "Angel" and Franz Schubert's Ave Maria" were performed at the end. She continued on to sing "Broken-Hearted Girl" wearing a white bustier with a sheer, flowing wrap. Outtakes from the music video of "If I Were a Boy" were Beyoncé appeared to perform the aforementioned song dressed as a cop wearing Ray-Bans and a leather breastplate. Excerpts from Alanis Morissette's "You Oughta Know" and Tupac Shakur's "California Love" were incorporated in the middle of the song. A video interlude directed by Melina Matsoukas was shown set to "Sweet Dreams". The video showed a robotic Beyoncé interacting with a cheetah as a mechanical voice intoned Sasha Fierce. Beyoncé then appeared on stage dressed in a leopard-print leotard to perform "Diva". She appeared at the top of the staircase with her backup female dancers; a video interlude showing a five-year old Beyoncé singing and dancing was shown in the middle of the song. She then sang "Radio" while the clip of her dancing as ac child was still projected on the screen. "Me, Myself and I" was introduced with a brief speech about female empowerment. "Ego" and "Hello" were performed afterwards.

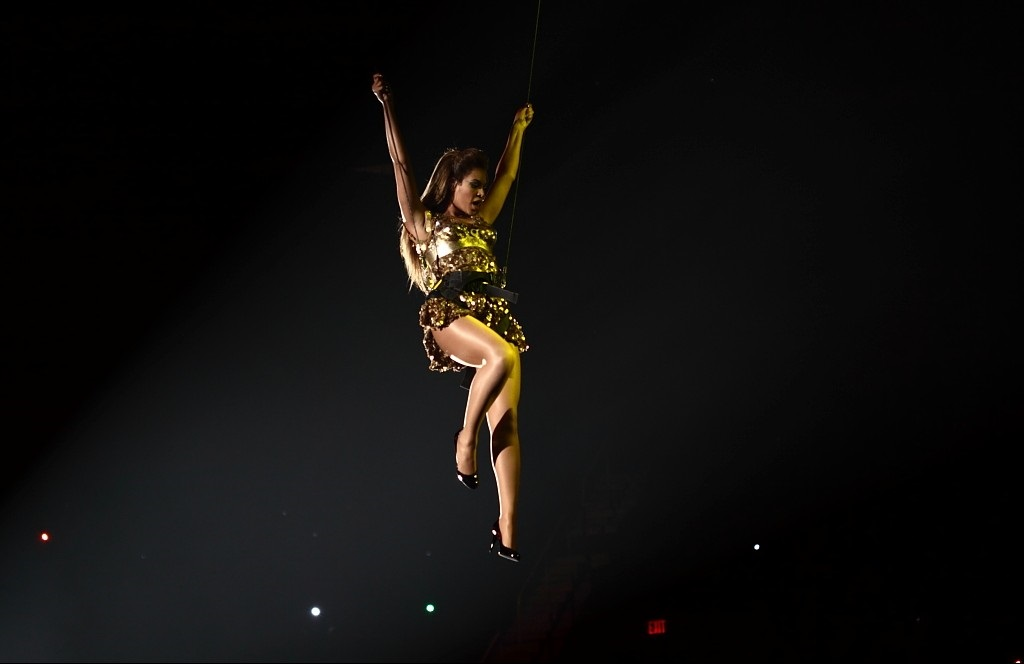
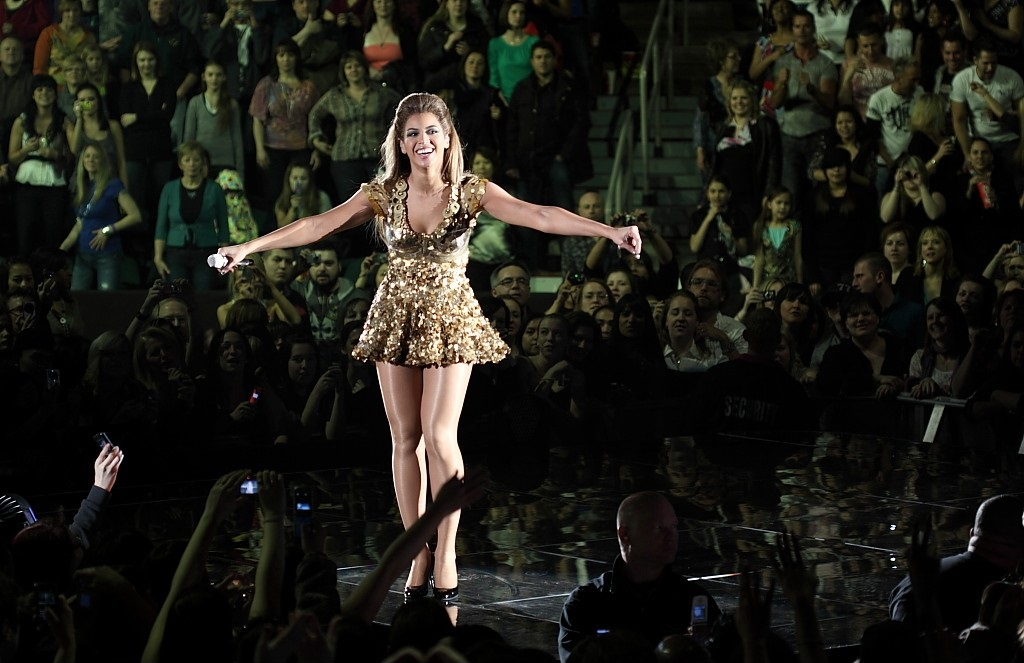
Knowles being lifted with a harness during the performance of "Baby Boy" (left) and transported to a B-stage where she performed several songs near the audience (right)

The show continued with a short medley performed by her backup singers, The Mamas, followed by another video interlude, featuring Sasha Fierce. Beyoncé appeared on stage after a gong bang; she was lifted out of a 20-foot train by a harness and performed "Baby Boy" while high-stepping and front-flipping above the audience. She was then lowered to the B-stage where she finished the song and continued with a cover Dawn Penn's "You Don't Love Me (No, No, No)". A stripped-down version of "Irreplaceable" was sung afterwards with frequent crowd interactions. Beyoncé then continued with "Check On It" and a medley of Destiny's Child hits including "Bootylicious", "Jumpin' Jumpin'", "Independent Women", "Bills, Bills, Bills" and "Survivor". Performances of "Upgrade U" and "Video Phone" followed. For the performance of the two songs, Beyoncé was accompanied by two female dancers and three male dancers, one of whom recorded a live stream of her with a camera throughout the routine during the performance of the latter song. This was followed by a rendition of "Say My Name" where she interacted with members of the audience, asking them to say her name. The concert followed back at the main stage where for the penultimate section, Beyoncé appeared wearing a gown and singing "At Last". A footage of her performance of the song at Barack Obama's inauguration as President of the United States, video images of civil rights era footage and snippets from her performance of the song in the movie, Cadillac Records (2008) were shown on the screen behind here. "Listen" was performed afterwards. This was followed by a YouTube video interlude featuring imitations of the choreography of "Single Ladies (Put a Ring on It)" performed by fans as well as Barack Obama and Justin Timberlake. Beyoncé then performed the song's trademark choreography accompanied by two female back-up dancers. For the finale, an extended version of "Halo" was performed while the singer descended from the stage to shake hands with fans in the front rows. She then went to the top of the staircase and repeatedly said "I am", awaiting the crowd to say it back. The letters "I am... yours" were displayed on the screen as she exited the stage.

== Critical response ==
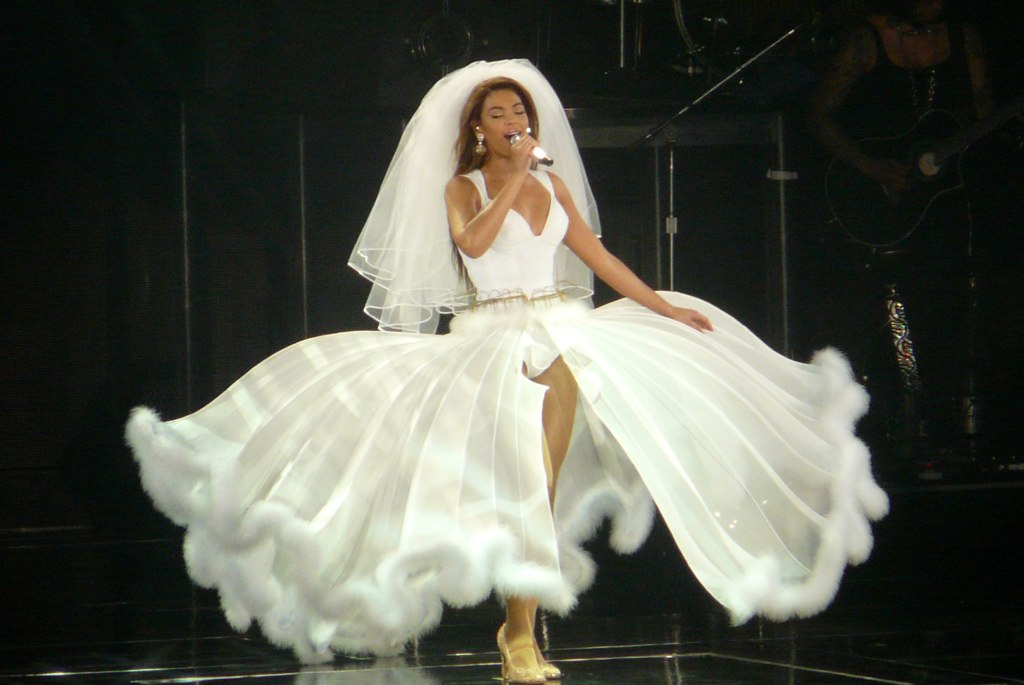
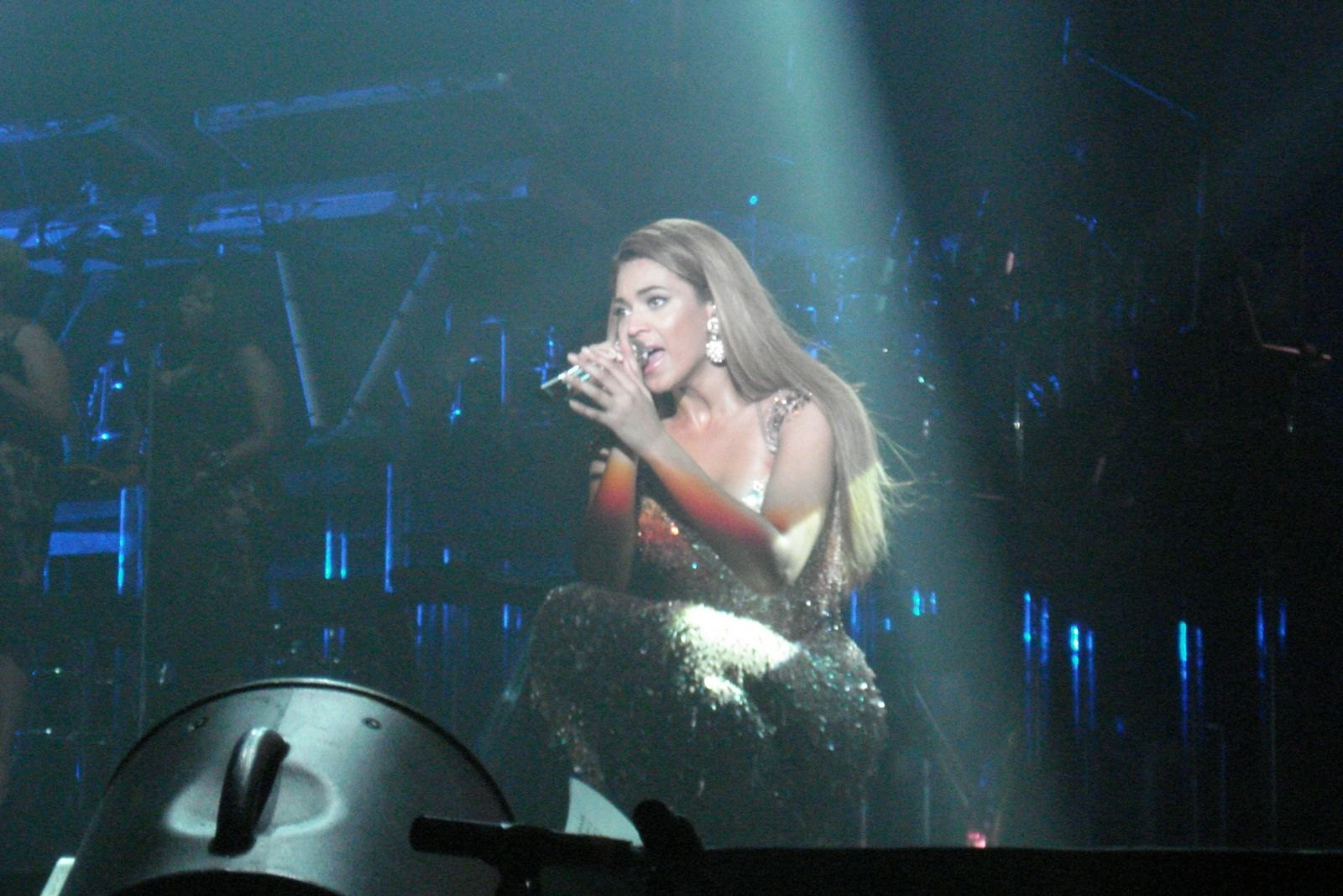
Knowles performing "Ave María" (left) and "Scared of Lonely" (right)

Beyonce's entrance at the O2 makes the finale of 'Close Encounters of the Third Kind' seem like an exercise in tasteful understatement. As dry ice gusts wildly about the stage and Wagnerian horns blare, a statuesque silhouette appears, hand on hips, head tilted imperiously. Then the swelling intro to 'Crazy In Love' kicks in, the smoke clears, and there stands Beyonce, superhumanly buff and glamorous. You are left in no doubt that tonight you are in the presence of pop royalty ... There's so much glittering spectacle that you could be at a lavish Broadway musical or a presidential inauguration ... Pop music doesn't get any smarter, sassier or more spectacular.

— Nick Kelly, Irish Independent

The tour received rave reviews from critics. Mike Ross of the website Jam! rated Beyoncé'ss performance with 4.5 out of 5 stars, praising the "high-production", the singer's wide vocal range and her "riveting presence". Stephanie Classen of The Star Phoenix remarked, "Beyoncé doesn't really need the bells and whistles of a big stadium show, but it sure makes for an unforgettable concert." Randall King of the Winnipeg Free Press graded the tour 4 stars out of 5 and praised the "back and forth" switch between the double persona throughout the show with the singer exhibiting both "raw energy" and "feeling"-induced ballads. Alice Jones of The Independent emphasized how the singer managed to "sing her heart out" in various musical styles that characterize the show's songs while further praising the energetic choreography and the vocals that range from "caramel smooth to honeyed foghorn". She concluded her review by saying, "Watching Beyoncé sing and strut her stuff can feel at best overawing, at worst, alienating".

Ben Ratliff of The New York Times observed that the show would make spectators question themselves how the singer managed to put on a "dazzling show" both physically and organizationally; he further praised the singer's "hollering voice, her imperious movement, her costume changes and the show's crush of concepts with their long tails of reference". Deborah Mcaleese and Lauren Mulvenny of The Belfast Telegraph described the show as "incredible... mind blowing... [and] electrifying". A writer of Evening Chronicle wrote that the show's set abounded with "bling, glamour and, most importantly, enthusiasm", further praising her for the well-coordinated balance between "hit[ting] every note" and following elaborate choreographies. Jay Hanna of The Sunday Times felt that the show's encore ("Halo") was the most memorable moment of the set. She also praised the singer's "enviable" dancing skills, "spectacular production and audio visuals" but noted that some songs "let down" the performance by being less melodic. Jay Lustig of The Star-Ledger described the show as a "bona fide pop spectacle" with futuristic themes throughout. Jim Farber from the Daily News viewed the tour as "a huge upgrade in charm, humor and chops" as compared to The Beyoncé Experience and added that "Beyoncé'ss presence punctuated her singing like an exclamation point".

Describing the show as simultaneously "spellbinding, exhausting to watch and hugely slick", Michael Cragg of musicOMH noted that the highlights included songs from the Sasha Fierce half of the album. Caryn Ganz of Rolling Stone magazine praised the show, lauding the singer for her work ethic and the ability to execute singing, dancing and posing at the same time. Jayson Rodriguez of MTV News, commented "Through six outfit changes, bombastic ballads, high-energy singles and a daring high-wire journey from the stage to the center of the arena, Beyoncé delivered over and over again." A writer of Billboard magazine noted that Beyoncé "brought all the fierceness" on stage for the tour. The Australian's Patrick Emery noted that Beyoncé showcased her self-assurance and professionalism in "full view". Comparing her performance with Michael Jackson's live shows, Renee Michelle Harris of the South Florida Times writes, "[Beyoncé] owns the stage with her trademark swagger and intensity... showcasing her powerful vocals without missing a note, often while engaged in vigorous, perfectly executed dance moves". Holly Burnes of The Daily Telegraph noted that the performance was almost inimitable and added "Whether crumping, sweeping across the stage in towering heels, or simply standing still, Beyonce was dynamite, blasting the benchmark for concert performers forever".

Simon Colling from The West Australian described the performance as "powerhouse" and added, "Beyoncé'ss high-energy, high-voltage mix of song (loud, commercial R&B) and dance recalled names like Tina Turner, Aretha Franklin and rapper Missy Elliott... [and] Mariah Carey". Joanna Horowitz of The Seattle Times noted that despite the inclusion of almost 10 different musical styles in the show's set list, the singer's "own [musical] signature" and focus were lacking. Nevertheless, Horowitz praised the singer's performing skills and summarized the concert as "a hip-hop Cirque du Soleil — sequins galore, dramatic dance numbers, and Beyoncé at one point soaring". The Observer's Barbara Ellen wrote, "she is a force of nature – delivering one of the most enjoyable well-paced shows I've seen in years". However, she noted that Beyoncé is "so steeped in professionalism that what should be magical can become mechanical." Noting influences by Tina Turner and Barbra Streisand during the tour, Ann Powers of Los Angeles Times writes: "And she danced like only Beyonce can dance, with a combination of power, grace and smarts that fully unites Broadway choreography with urban street innovations ... Indeed, her production can be seen as a retelling of pop's history from a feminine viewpoint -- and as an argument for Beyonce as the ultimate realization of the female pop dream."

Ben Ratliff of The New York Times summarized the tour's concept as "the duality of well-meaning good girl and rapacious animal-robot-dance-titan." Jay Lustig of The Star-Ledger concluded that the album's split personality was reflected in the show naturally enough. However, Barbara Ellen of The Observer wrote, "Another irritant is the much-trumpeted 'duality' nonsense with Sasha Fierce, Beyoncé'ss alter-ego for her latest album. All 'Sasha' does here is flail about in a video, no different from regular Beyoncé, except for a gold dress and a hairdo that veers dangerously towards Liberace." Similarly, Ann Powers from the Los Angeles Times wrote that the only thing which was not fully realized was the show's "overarching" theme, "Beyonce meant to represent herself as a split personality, tender and open on the one hand, indomitable and rather scary on the other. But Beyonce has chosen the wrong dichotomy to represent herself."

== Commercial performance ==
Tickets for the American leg of the tour were available for pre-sale for members of Beyoncé's fan club on April 20, 2008 and the official tickets went on sale to the general public through Ticketmaster on April 25. In late May 2009, Beyoncé's label announced through a press release that the singer decided to set aside 2,000 seats for each date on her then-forthcoming North American tour at a discounted price of $20. After already selling 1,000 tickets per show for the special low price, the last 1,000 discounted seats for each show were made available to the public on May 29, 2009 through Ticketmaster (with the exception of the artist's four-night residency at the Encore at Wynn Las Vegas). Due to the big demand, Sony Music announced additional dates in England, Asia and South America. In May 2009, Beyoncé's official website was peppered with requests by disappointed fans — from Boston; Anchorage, Alaska; Tampa, Florida; St. Louis and Montreal — who asked from her to come to their towns. Beyoncé broke her record of concert attendees by selling out the Morumbi Stadium in São Paulo, Brazil, with over 60,000 tickets sold. It was reported to Billboard that as of September 16, 2009, from the 53 shows, Beyoncé grossed $53.5 million and drawn 667,509 fans from the mostly 15,000-seat arenas. In 2009, the tour was nominated for Eventful Fans' Choice Award at the 6th Annual Billboard Touring Awards. The tour grossed $86 million from 93 concert shows and all 103 shows total grossed $119.5 million.

== Controversy in Malaysia ==
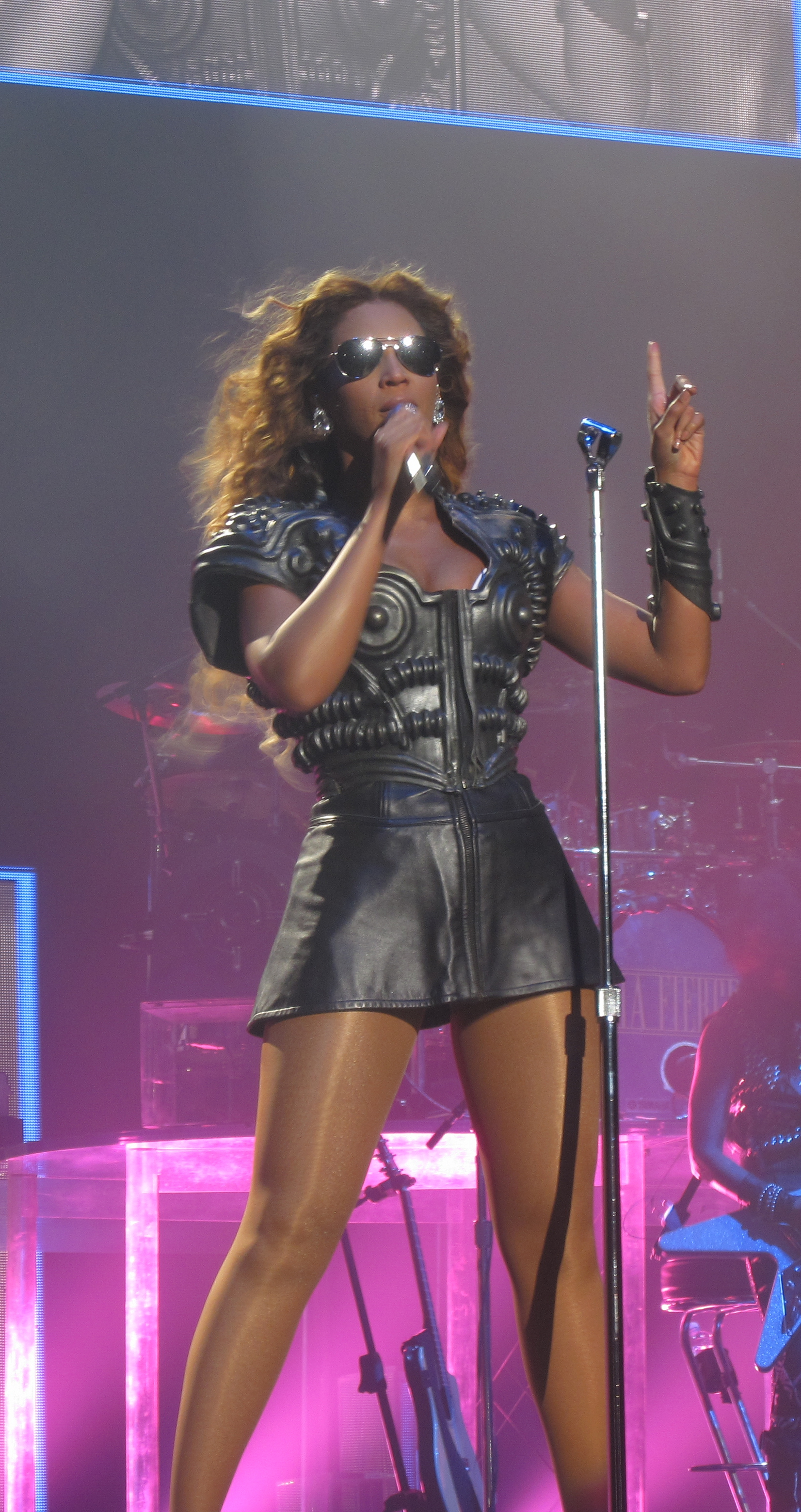
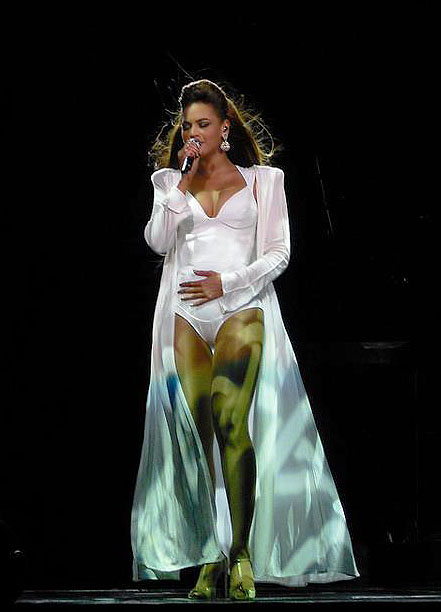
Knowles on tour. For the performances of "If I Were a Boy" (left) she wore futuristic designs and heralded the arrival of her onstage persona while a white dress was designed for the performances of "Broken-Hearted Girl" (right) and other ballads to show her emotional side.

In September 2009, it was announced by the Associated Press that Beyoncé would be bringing her tour to Kuala Lumpur, Malaysia, with a show scheduled for 25 October. However, despite the singer’s largely "squeaky-clean", respectable reputation, some of Beyoncé's skimpier outfits and potentially suggestive dance moves would have to be slightly edited and changed to suit the conservative, predominantly Muslim, Southeast Asian country. This agreement came after Beyoncé received word of opposition, mainly from the Pan-Malaysian Islamic Party, which stated: "We are against Western sexy performances; we don't think our people need that." However, a representative soon issued a comment on behalf of the tour's Malaysian promoter, stating that "all parties have reached an amicable understanding" about the standards. He went on, saying that Beyoncé could be regarded as a suitable "role model", as she is the "embodiment of success", as well as her philanthropic work, including campaigns against poverty and domestic violence, and visiting ill and dying children in hospital, while in Asia. The promoter further told the Associated Press: "We are confident that Beyoncé's concert will once and for all silence international critics and put Malaysia back on track and move up the ranks in presenting A-list international pop concerts in this region and further boost tourism."

However, in early October 2009, it was suddenly announced that the concert had been delayed again, in the wake of new concerns (by Islamic conservatives) that the show would simply be too "immoral and unclean". Malaysian promoter Marctensia said, in a statement, that the show had been "postponed to a future date", to be announced soon thereafter, adding that: "The postponement is solely [the] decision of the artist and has nothing to with other external reasons." Another representative declined to comment on whether or not the show was postponed due to the heavy criticism it was receiving from religious leaders in the country. The tour also faced oppositions by Islamic conservatives in Egypt, who branded it as an "insolent sex party" that threatens the Muslim nation's "social peace and stability", despite the singer being in love, and married, to Jay-Z, and overall a very private person. Two years prior to this performance, in 2007, Beyoncé's a show in Malaysia but backed out due to similar protests regarding her performance.

== Recordings and broadcasts ==
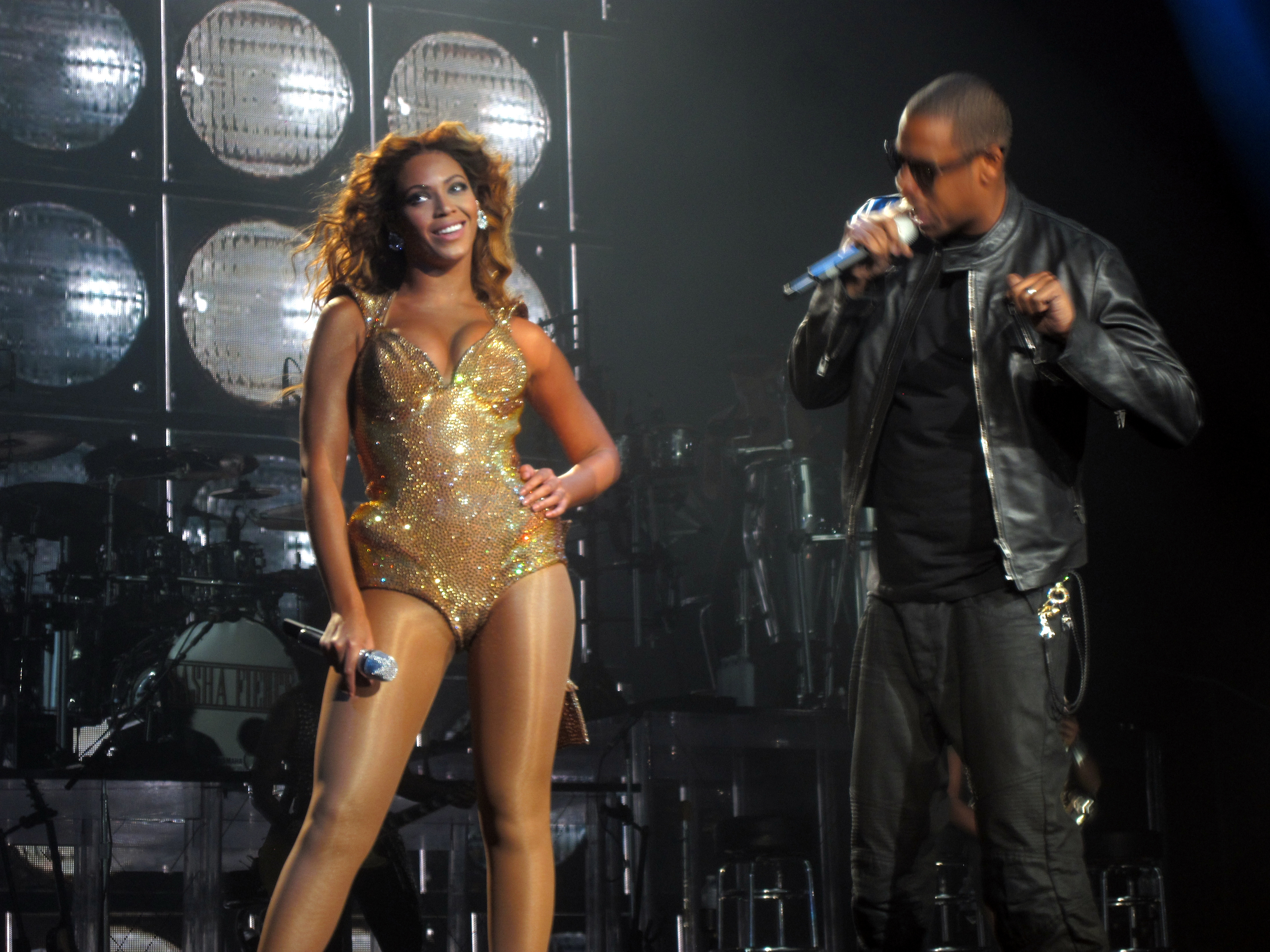
Beyoncé performing "Crazy in Love" with Jay-Z during the I Am... tour stop at The O_{2} arena in London

While the singer was on tour, she was asked to perform a Las Vegas residency-type of show. Beyoncé and her team produced the shows in seven days and entitled it I Am... Yours. She performed an unplugged, acoustic styled show different from the rest of her tour, at the Encore Theater in Las Vegas. The show on August 2, 2009 was recorded and later released as a DVD, audio CD and television special in late November 2009 titled I Am... Yours: An Intimate Performance at Wynn Las Vegas. The DVD was commercially successful peaking at number one on the Nielsen SoundScan Music DVD chart. It was certified double platinum by the Recording Industry Association of America (RIAA). Another live CD/DVD of the tour was released as I Am... World Tour in late November 2010. The album contained performances from different stops of the tour blended with personal footage of Beyoncé's backstage work and thoughts about the tour and her life. It served as the directorial debut for Beyoncé. The DVD was commercially successful becoming the best selling DVD in the world in 2010.

Parts of the show in Vancouver on March 31, 2009 were recorded and have been used for commercial use, as well as photos from the show used in the official tour book and other promotional items. "If I Were A Boy" and "Single Ladies (Put a Ring on It)" from the show in New Orleans were recorded and shown on TV One as a part of the Essence Music Festival in 2009. A CD and DVD, released on June 15, 2010, featured her performance of "Single Ladies (Put a Ring on It)". "Crazy In Love", "Freakum Dress", "Get Me Bodied", "Smash Into You" and "Broken-Hearted Girl" from the show in Donetsk, Ukraine, were recorded professionally and shown on TRK Ukraina as part of their footage of the Donbas Arena opening. "Crazy In Love" and "Single Ladies" were professionally recorded at the Summer Sonic Festival in Osaka, Japan and used to promote Beyoncé's Japanese tour. "Crazy In Love" and "Naughty Girl" were also professionally recorded at the 2009 Singapore Grand Prix F1 Rocks event in Singapore for Channel HD 5 Live coverage. "Crazy In Love" was recorded professionally and shown on Frecuencia Latina from the show in Lima, Peru at the Explanada del Estadio Monumental.

== Opening acts ==
- RichGirl (North America)
- Flo Rida (Australia)
- Eva Avila (Canada)
- Linda Teodosiu (Austria, Germany and Switzerland)
- Ildiko Keresztes and Karmatronic (Hungary)
- Marek Ztracený (Czech Republic)
- Humphrey (France)
- DJ Lester & Abdou (Belgium)
- Miguel Simões and Verinha Mágica (Portugal)
- Labuat (Barcelona)
- Shontelle (England and Ireland)
- Jessica Mauboy (Australia)
- Zarif (England and Ireland)
- Ádammo (Peru)
- Ivete Sangalo (Brazil)
- Wanessa (Brazil)

== Set list ==
The following set list is not representative of all concerts for the duration of the tour.

1. "Crazy in Love" (contains elements of "Déjà Vu" and "I Just Wanna Love U")
2. "Naughty Girl"
3. "Freakum Dress"
4. "Get Me Bodied"
5. "Smash Into You"
6. "Ave Maria" (contains elements of "Ellens dritter Gesang") / "Angel"
7. "Broken-Hearted Girl"
8. "If I Were a Boy" (contains excerpts of "You Oughta Know" and "California Love")
9. "Diva"
10. "Radio"
11. "Me, Myself and I"
12. "Ego"
13. "Hello"
14. "Baby Boy" / "You Don't Love Me (No, No, No)"
15. "Irreplaceable"
16. "Check on It"
17. Destiny's Child Medley: "Bootylicious" / "Bug a Boo" / "Jumpin', Jumpin'" (contains elements of "Independent Women Part I", "Survivor" and "Bills, Bills, Bills")
18. "Upgrade U"
19. "Video Phone"
20. "Say My Name"
21. "At Last"
22. "Listen"
23. "Single Ladies (Put a Ring on It)"
24. "Halo"

=== Notes ===
- As the grand opening of Donetsk's new sporting arena, the Donbas Arena drew near, it was announced by local organizers that Beyoncé will perform as part of her tour. The ceremony involved a dance production dedicated to Ukraine's miners. Local artists Natal'ya Mogilevskaya, Svetlana Loboda and Aliona Vinnitskaya performed Queen's "We Will Rock You". Afterwards, a speech by Victor Yushchenko, president of Ukraine was given. Beyoncé performed audience of nearly 45,000.
- On June 9, 2009, Beyoncé was joined by George Michael on stage for the performance of "If I Were a Boy".
- On June 22, 2009, Jay-Z appeared on stage with Beyoncé in the middle of "Crazy in Love" and rapped a verse from his song "I Just Wanna Love U (Give It 2 Me)".
- On July 3, 2009, during the Essence Music Festival, Beyoncé dedicated the performance to Michael Jackson following his death. A video of Beyoncé at the age five was projected on the screen showing her doing an impression of the artist. Beyoncé said, "That's when I decided who I wanted to be", stating that Jackson was responsible for the inspiration. She went on to sing "Halo" dedicating the lyrics to Jackson.
- On July 16, 2009, Solange Knowles appeared as a special guest during the show which was aimed to benefit the Charles & Phyllis Newman Foundation and Beyoncé's charitable organization, The Survivor Foundation.
- On November 16, 2009, Beyoncé was joined on stage by Kanye West who performed "Ego", and Jay-Z who rapped his verse on "Crazy in Love".

== Shows ==
List of concerts, showing date, city, country, venue, opening act, attendance and gross revenue
Date	City	Country	Venue	Attendance	Revenue
March 26, 2009	Edmonton	Canada	Rexall Place	6,618 / 10,596	$570,147
March 27, 2009	Saskatoon	Canada	Credit Union Centre	5,280 / 9,847	$373,817
March 28, 2009	Winnipeg	Canada	MTS Centre	8,971 / 8,971	$378,530
March 31, 2009	Vancouver	Canada	General Motors Place	12,595 / 12,595	$869,402
April 1, 2009	Seattle	United States	KeyArena	10,579 / 10,579	$1,565,289
April 26, 2009	Zagreb	Croatia	Arena Zagreb	16,599 / 17,190	$821,482
April 28, 2009	Vienna	Austria	Wiener Stadthalle	4,150 / 5,100	$389,427
April 29, 2009	Budapest	Hungary	Budapest Sports Arena	9,000 / 9,000	$846,703
April 30, 2009	Prague	Czech Republic	O_{2} Arena	16,500 / 16,500	$1,612,045
May 2, 2009	Rotterdam	Netherlands	Sportpaleis van Ahoy	20,297 / 20,297	$1,410,944
May 3, 2009	Rotterdam	Netherlands	Sportpaleis van Ahoy	20,297 / 20,297	$1,410,944
May 5, 2009	Paris	France	Palais Omnisports de Paris-Bercy	16,149 / 16,149	$1,139,204
May 6, 2009	Strasbourg	France	Zénith de Strasbourg	9,969 / 10,300	$855,004
May 7, 2009	Antwerp	Belgium	Sportpaleis	15,780 / 15,836	$1,031,961
May 8, 2009	Berlin	Germany	O_{2} World	10,039 / 12,477	$602,785
May 10, 2009	Herning	Denmark	Hall M	7,222 / 7,222	$514,196
May 11, 2009	Gothenburg	Sweden	Scandinavium	8,500 / 8,500	$882,782
May 13, 2009	Stockholm	Sweden	Ericsson Globe	10,640 / 10,640	$707,602
May 15, 2009	Oberhausen	Germany	König-Pilsener Arena	10,037 / 10,037	$958,070
May 16, 2009	Zürich	Switzerland	Hallenstadion	12,240 / 12,240	$1,280,043
May 18, 2009	Lisbon	Portugal	Pavilhão Atlântico	18,649 / 18,649	$1,180,524
May 19, 2009	Madrid	Spain	WiZink Center	15,061 / 15,061	$903,901
May 20, 2009	Barcelona	Spain	Palau Sant Jordi	15,013 / 15,013	$958,351
May 22, 2009	Newcastle	England	Metro Radio Arena	10,446 / 11,153	$801,884
May 23, 2009	Birmingham	England	National Indoor Arena	11,256 / 11,256	$837,761
May 25, 2009	London	England	The O_{2} Arena	61,030 / 69,520	$4,546,510
May 26, 2009	London	England	The O_{2} Arena	61,030 / 69,520	$4,546,510
May 27, 2009	Manchester	England	Manchester Evening News Arena	14,592 / 14,830	$1,086,717
May 29, 2009	Dublin	Ireland	The O_{2}	50,606 / 50,606	$4,504,426
May 30, 2009	Dublin	Ireland	The O_{2}	50,606 / 50,606	$4,504,426
May 31, 2009	Belfast	Northern Ireland	Odyssey Arena	19,600 / 19,600	$1,588,267
June 1, 2009	Belfast	Northern Ireland	Odyssey Arena	19,600 / 19,600	$1,588,267
June 3, 2009	Dublin	Ireland	The O_{2}	(Note: The score data is representative of the six shows in Dublin, Ireland at the O2 on May 29, May 30, June 3, June 4, November 22, and November 23 respectively.)	
June 4, 2009	Dublin	Ireland	The O_{2}	(Note: The score data is representative of the six shows in Dublin, Ireland at the O2 on May 29, May 30, June 3, June 4, November 22, and November 23 respectively.)	
June 6, 2009	Liverpool	England	Echo Arena Liverpool	10,730/ 10,730	$913,026
June 7, 2009	Sheffield	England	Sheffield Arena	11,049 / 11,049	$901,750
June 8, 2009	London	England	The O_{2} Arena	(Note: The score data is representative of the seven shows in London, England at the O2 Arena on May 25, May 26, June 8, June 9, November 14, November 15, and November 16 respectively.)	
June 9, 2009	London	England	The O_{2} Arena	(Note: The score data is representative of the seven shows in London, England at the O2 Arena on May 25, May 26, June 8, June 9, November 14, November 15, and November 16 respectively.)	
June 21, 2009	New York City	United States	Madison Square Garden	27,580 / 27,580	$3,526,375
June 22, 2009	New York City	United States	Madison Square Garden	27,580 / 27,580	$3,526,375
June 23, 2009	Baltimore	United States	1st Mariner Arena	8,619 / 8,619	$683,904
June 24, 2009	Washington, D.C.	United States	Verizon Center	12,993 / 12,993	$1,390,421
June 26, 2009	Philadelphia	United States	Wachovia Center	14,971 / 14,971	$1,377,995
June 27, 2009	Greensboro	United States	Greensboro Coliseum	10,600 / 10,600	$779,424
June 29, 2009	Sunrise	United States	BankAtlantic Center	11,711 / 13,209	$1,043,162
July 1, 2009	Atlanta	United States	Philips Arena	15,709 / 15,709	$1,281,632
July 3, 2009 (Note: The July 3, 2009 concert in New Orleans, Louisiana at the Louisiana Superdome was a part of the Essence Music Festival.)	New Orleans	United States	Louisiana Superdome	—N/a	—N/a
July 4, 2009	Houston	United States	Toyota Center	12,431 / 12,431	$1,158,361
July 5, 2009	Dallas	United States	American Airlines Center	11,319 / 11,906	$981,124
July 7, 2009	Phoenix	United States	US Airways Center	8,831 / 12,727	$483,805
July 9, 2009	Sacramento	United States	ARCO Arena	7,770 / 11,214	$583,801
July 10, 2009	Oakland	United States	Oracle Arena	10,250 / 11,653	$1,016,012
July 11, 2009	Anaheim	United States	Honda Center	9,924 / 12,287	$937,185
July 13, 2009	Los Angeles	United States	Staples Center	12,738 / 14,217	$1,437,146
July 16, 2009	Minneapolis	United States	Target Center	6,856 / 8,404	$633,501
July 17, 2009	Chicago	United States	United Center	13,852 / 14,773	$1,359,250
July 18, 2009	Auburn Hills	United States	The Palace of Auburn Hills	13,540 / 13,540	$860,250
July 20, 2009	Toronto	Canada	Molson Amphitheatre	16,000 / 16,000	$1,407,811
July 21, 2009	Montreal	Canada	Bell Centre	10,630 / 10,630	$1,149,946
July 23, 2009	Uncasville	United States	Mohegan Sun Arena	4,444 / 4,450	$572,150
July 24, 2009	East Rutherford	United States	Izod Center	10,435 / 13,702	$968,245
August 7, 2009 (Note: The August 7, 2009 concert in Osaka, Japan at the Maishima Sports Island and the August 9, 2009 concert in Chiba, Japan at the Chiba Marine Stadium were a part of the Summer Sonic Festival.)	Osaka	Japan	Maishima Sports Island	—N/a	—N/a
August 9, 2009	Chiba	Japan	Chiba Marine Stadium	—N/a	—N/a
August 29, 2009 (Note: The August 29, 2009 concert in Donetsk, Ukraine at the Donbas Arena was a part of the venue's opening event.)	Donetsk	Ukraine	Donbas Arena	—N/a	—N/a
September 15, 2009	Melbourne	Australia	Rod Laver Arena	24,548 / 24,548	$2,988,575
September 16, 2009	Melbourne	Australia	Rod Laver Arena	24,548 / 24,548	$2,988,575
September 18, 2009	Sydney	Australia	Acer Arena	29,584 / 29,584	$3,541,073
September 19, 2009	Sydney	Australia	Acer Arena	29,584 / 29,584	$3,541,073
September 20, 2009 (Note: The September 20, 2009 concert in Brisbane, Australia at the Brisbane Entertainment Centre was originally planned to take place on September 13 but was rescheduled due to an unforeseen change in the international schedule.)	Brisbane	Australia	Brisbane Entertainment Centre	11,462 / 11,741	$1,537,052
September 22, 2009	Adelaide	Australia	Adelaide Entertainment Centre	7,301 / 7,301	$936,951
September 24, 2009	Perth	Australia	Burswood Dome	18,216 / 18,216	$2,271,739
September 26, 2009 (Note: The September 26, 2009 concert in Central Area, Singapore at the Fort Canning Park was a part of F1 Rocks Singapore.)	Singapore		Fort Canning	—N/a	—N/a
October 12, 2009	Kobe	Japan	World Memorial Hall	15,500 / 15,500	$1,491,274
October 13, 2009	Osaka	Japan	Osaka-Jo Hall	8,500 / 8,500	$1,099,184
October 15, 2009	Nagoya	Japan	Nippon Gaishi Hall	9,700 / 9,700	$1,011,452
October 17, 2009	Saitama	Japan	Saitama Super Arena	30,000 / 30,000	$3,085,520
October 18, 2009	Saitama	Japan	Saitama Super Arena	30,000 / 30,000	$3,085,520
October 20, 2009	Seoul	South Korea	Olympic Gymnastics Arena	22,000 / 22,000	$3,061,631
October 21, 2009	Seoul	South Korea	Olympic Gymnastics Arena	22,000 / 22,000	$3,061,631
October 23, 2009	Beijing	China	Wukesong Indoor Stadium	9,952 / 9,952	$1,010,745
October 29, 2009 (Note: The October 29, 2009 concert in Abu Dhabi, UAE at the Yas Arena was a part of the Yasalam After-Race Concerts.)	Abu Dhabi	United Arab Emirates	Du Arena	—N/a	—N/a
November 2, 2009	Moscow	Russia	Olimpiysky	16,900 / 16,900	$1,873,500
November 6, 2009	Marsa Alam	Egypt	The Island at Port Ghalib	—N/a	—N/a
November 8, 2009	Athens	Greece	O.A.C.A. Olympic Indoor Hall	15,279 / 15,279	$1,836,942
November 11, 2009	Liverpool	England	Echo Arena Liverpool	10,876 / 10,876	$1,029,875
November 12, 2009	Birmingham	England	National Indoor Arena	11,164 / 11,164	$997,111
November 14, 2009	London	England	The O_{2} Arena	51,900 / 51,900	$3,490,327
November 15, 2009	London	England	The O_{2} Arena	51,900 / 51,900	$3,490,327
November 16, 2009	London	England	The O_{2} Arena	51,900 / 51,900	$3,490,327
November 18, 2009	Manchester	England	Manchester Evening News Arena	14,718 / 14,780	$1,223,034
November 19, 2009	Newcastle	England	Metro Radio Arena	11,465 / 11,465	$1,046,547
November 20, 2009	Nottingham	England	Trent FM Arena Nottingham	9,670 / 9,670	$940,571
November 22, 2009	Dublin	Ireland	3Arena	25,094 / 25,158	$2,471,351
November 23, 2009	Dublin	Ireland	3Arena	25,094 / 25,158	$2,471,351
November 24, 2009	Belfast	Northern Ireland	Odyssey Arena	9,756 / 9,756	$876,653
February 4, 2010	Florianópolis	Brazil	Parque do Planeta Atlântida	20,362 / 20,362	$2,389,778
February 6, 2010	São Paulo	Brazil	Estádio do Morumbi	52,757 / 52,757	$4,286,984
February 7, 2010	Rio de Janeiro	Brazil	HSBC Arena	24,686 / 24,686	$2,960,140
February 8, 2010	Rio de Janeiro	Brazil	HSBC Arena	24,686 / 24,686	$2,960,140
February 10, 2010	Salvador	Brazil	Parque de Exposições	28,776 / 28,776	$2,661,909
February 12, 2010	Buenos Aires	Argentina	Hipódromo de San Isidro	8,467 / 8,467	$618,442
February 14, 2010	Santiago	Chile	Movistar Arena	8,914 / 8,914	$858,906
February 16, 2010	Lima	Peru	Explanada del Estadio Monumental	11,476 / 11,476	$1,182,769
February 18, 2010 (Note: The February 18, 2010 concert in the Port of Spain in Trinidad and Tobago was originally planned to take place at the Queen's Park Oval but was moved to the Queen's Park Savannah)	Port of Spain	Trinidad and Tobago	Queen's Park Savannah	12,719 / 12,719	$2,232,071
Total				1,214,842 / 1,248,015 (97,3%)	$113,646,156

== Cancelled shows ==
List of cancelled concerts, showing date, city, country, venue and reason for cancellation
Date	City	Country	Venue	Reason
July 22, 2009	Mansfield	United States	Comcast Center	Production and logistical issues
September 20, 2009	Sydney	Australia	Acer Arena	Unforeseen change in international schedule
October 25, 2009	Kuala Lumpur	Malaysia	Bukit Jalil National Stadium	Opposition from Islamist party
October 28, 2009	Istanbul	Turkey	Şükrü Saracoğlu Stadium	Unsettling events in Turkey
October 31, 2009	Addis Ababa	Ethiopia	Millennium Hall	Disagreement over live broadcasting rights of the concert
February 20, 2010	San Juan	Puerto Rico	José Miguel Agrelot Coliseum	Unknown
March 20, 2010	Santo Domingo	Dominican Republic	Estadio Olímpico Félix Sánchez	Unknown

== Personnel ==
Personnel adapted as per the I Am... concert booklet and live performance DVD.

Lead Vocals

- Beyoncé Knowles – main artist, lead singer, lead vocals

Creative Direction

- Beyoncé and Frank Gatson – show direction, staging, choreography
- Thierry Mugler – creative advisor, costume designer
- Kim Burse – creative director
- Tina Knowles – creative consultant, stylist
- Ty Hunter – stylist

Suga Mama Band

- Bibi McGill – music director, guitar
- Divinity Walker Roxx – music director, bass
- Rie Tsuji – assistant music director, keyboards
- Brittani Washington – keyboards
- Marcie Chapa – percussion
- Nikki Glaspie – drums
- Kim Thompson – drums
- Crystal Torres – trumpet
- Tia Fuller – alto saxophone
- Katty Rodriguez-Harrold – tenor saxophone

The Mamas (Background Vocalists):

- Montina Cooper – background singer
- Crystal A. Collins – background singer
- Tiffany Moníque Riddick – background singer

Choreographers

- Beyoncé
- Frank Gatson Jr.
- JaQuel Knight

Assistant Choreographers

- Dana Foglia – dance swing
- Christopher (Kriyss) Grant
- Rosero McCoy
- Kobi Rozenfeld
- Tony Michales
- Derrel Bullock
- Bryan Tanaka
- Sheryl Murakami
- Rhapshody James
- Cliff McGhee
- Benny Andrews
- Jonte' Moaning
- Ramon Baynes

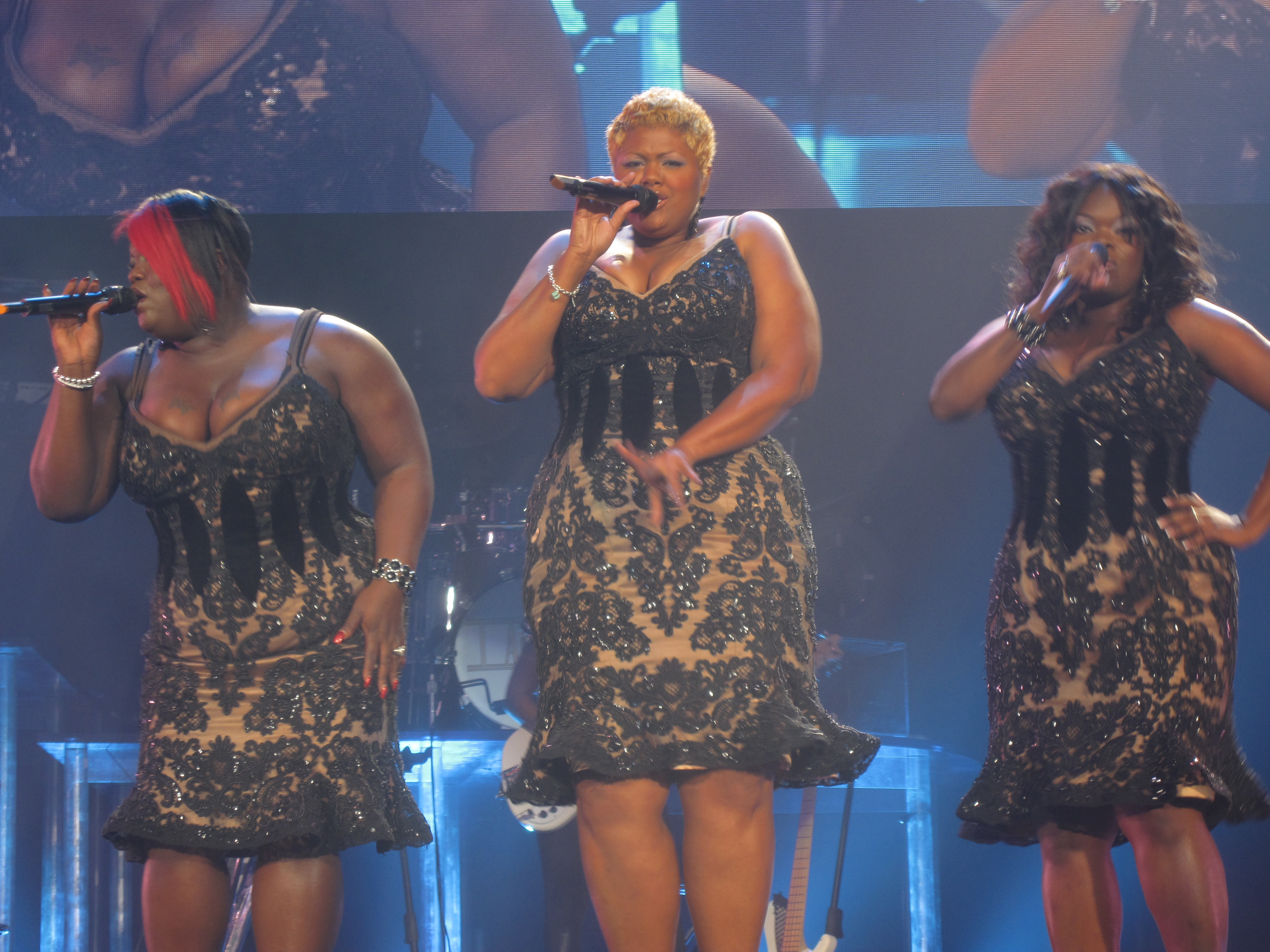
Knowles' background vocalists the Mamas (pictured), performing during a show in London. They sang over "lush" harmonies during Knowles' costume changes.

Dancers

- Ashley Everett – female dance captain
- Tuere Tanee McCall (Left After North American Leg)
- Ashley Seldon
- Saidah Fishenden
- Kimberly Gipson
- Bryan Tanaka – male dance captain
- Cassidy Noblett
- Khasan Brailsford
- Shaun Walker

Security

- Julius DeBoer – head security for Beyoncé
- Colin McNish – security for Beyoncé
- Terrill Eastman – head of venue security
- Bob Fontenot – venue security

Tour Management

- Alan Floyd – tour manager
- Marlon Bowers – assistant tour manager
- Larry Beyince – tour assistant
- Daniel Kernan – tour accountant
- Josh Katzman – tour accountant

Tour Sponsors

- MTV Europe – Europe/United Kingdom/Ireland
- Trident – United Kingdom & Ireland
- Nintendo – United Kingdom & Europe
- L'Oréal Paris – North America
- General Mills – North America
- Crystal Geyser – Japan
- Nestlé – South America
- bMobile – Trinidad

Tour Promoters

- AEG Live – United Kingdom
- Live Nation & Haymon Concerts – North America & Europe
- Michael Coppel Presents – Australia
- Music World Entertainment – Worldwide
- Aiken Promotions – Ireland
