= Livingstone II =

- Developer: Opera Soft
- Platform: Atari ST
- Release: 1989
- Genre: Platformer

Livingstone II, also called Livingstone Supongo II, is a 1989 platformer video game developed by Opera Soft. It is a sequel to the video game Livingstone, I Presume?.

== Reception ==
It received mixed reviews. Upon its release, Tilt gave the game a mixed review. Amiga Reviews gave it a score of 26%, criticizing the animations, gameplay sound design, and color palette.

Home of the Underdogs praised the game, writing that it is "easier than the first game, perhaps because most of the danger comes in the form of traps, which you just need good timing to avoid, rather than angry creatures that you must dispose of to save yourself. As in the first game, the maps in Livingstone II are large and intricate, full of hidden surprises and shortcuts." Javier Saez of CPC Game Reviews gave it a positive review for its gameplay and sound design.
