= The Last Mission (video game) =

1987 video game

- Developer: Opera Soft
- Publisher: Opera Soft
- Platforms: Sinclair Spectrum, Amstrad CPC, Amstrad PCW, MSX, and IBM PC
- Release: 1987
- Genre: Action video game
- Mode: Single-player

The Last Mission is a computer game released in 1987 by the Spanish company Opera Soft, for the Sinclair Spectrum, Amstrad CPC, and MSX. It was also ported to the IBM PC platform. It is a 2D flip-screen side-view game.

== Plot ==
Following a robot rebellion, humans have fled the Earth for the planet Nova. They have sent the robot OR-CABE-3 back to Earth to obtain the secret defense plans of the enemy robot base. The player takes control of OR-CABE-3 as it attempts to escape the enemy base with the plans and board a spacecraft for Nova.

== Gameplay ==
The player has the role of the robot OR-CABE-3 as it attempts to escape the enemy base and leave Earth. Starting at the deepest level of the base, where the robot has stolen the defense plans, it must evade hostile robots and travel to the surface, where an escape ship awaits.

The robot OR-CABE-3 resembles a tank with a rotating gun mounted on a caterpillar-track base. The gun section is capable of flight and may be detached from the base to kill enemies or solve problems, though it loses energy while in this state. If it runs out of energy the game ends. A life is lost if the gun section is destroyed. If the base section is destroyed it is respawned at the starting location, but no lives are lost.
