= Mundial de Fútbol =

1990 video game

- Developer: Opera Soft
- Publisher: Opera Soft
- Platforms: Amstrad CPC, ZX Spectrum, MSX, MS-DOS
- Release: 1990
- Genre: Sport

Mundial de Fútbol is a football sports video game released for the Amstrad CPC, ZX Spectrum, MSX and MS-DOS platforms. It was created in 1990 by Opera Soft. Due to internal problems of the company it was released after the celebration of the 1990 FIFA World Cup.

== Gameplay ==
The game is a sport simulation which has an upper view with goals at the upper and lower parts of the screen (where the players reach through a tough scroll).
