= Ave Maria (Beyoncé song) =

2008 song by Beyoncé

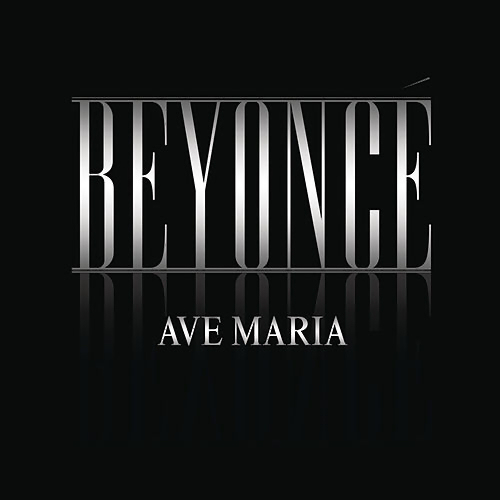

Song by Beyoncé

from the album I Am... Sasha Fierce
- Released: November 12, 2008
- Recorded: 2008
- Studio: Roc the Mic Studios (New York City, New York)
- Genre: Pop; R&B
- Length: 3:42
- Label: Columbia
- Composers: Mikkel Storleer Eriksen; Tor Erik Hermansen; Beyoncé Knowles
- Lyricists: Amanda Ghost; Knowles; Ian Dench; Makeba Riddick
- Producers: Stargate; Knowles

"Ave Maria" is a song by American singer Beyoncé from her third studio album I Am... Sasha Fierce (2008). Amanda Ghost, Ian Dench and Makeba Riddick wrote the song in collaboration with Beyoncé and production duo Stargate. As stated by Ghost, "Ave Maria" was inspired by Beyoncé's and her own respective marriages. The song is a re-write of Franz Schubert's "Ave Maria". It is instrumentally complete with a piano and strings. Throughout the pop-R&B ballad, Beyoncé sings in a lower register with an operatic soprano. Lyrically, it speaks about being surrounded by friends but still feeling alone.

Critical reception towards the song was mixed. Many contemporary critics praised its balladry and Beyoncé's vocals while others dubbed it as merely a normal take on the original. Following the release of I Am... Sasha Fierce, "Ave Maria" debuted on the UK Singles Chart at number 150 on November 29, 2008, based on downloads alone. The song was a part Beyoncé's set list during her I Am... World Tour (2009–10) where she sang it dressed in a wedding dress and veil. "Ave Maria" was subsequently included on her live album, I Am... World Tour (2010). Beyoncé also performed the song as a tribute to Michael Jackson during the 2009 BET Awards.

== Writing and inspiration ==
Mikkel Storleer Eriksen and Tor Erik Hermansen, together under the stage name Stargate, wrote and produced the song with Amanda Ghost, Ian Dench, Makeba Riddick and Beyoncé, who also co-produced it. The song was written in Bangladesh, Patchwerk and Silent Sound Studios in Atlanta, Georgia in 2008. Beyoncé worked with Amanda Ghost to re-write Franz Schubert's "Ave Maria" after having co-written "Disappear" in London. She stated that the song was one of the most personal on the album. Ghost told The Daily Telegraph that Beyoncé's references to rapper Jay-Z are usually unclear and open to interpretation, yet her music, including "Ave Maria", "is the one place she can be incredibly expressive". Beyoncé and Ghost both liked Schubert's song and walked down the aisle to the song during their respective weddings. The marriages of the artists inspired them to write their own version of the recording. She further discussed the lyrics and inspiration:

[T]he lyric is very much about her. She talks about being surrounded by friends but she's alone: 'How can the silence seem so loud?' and then 'There's only us when the lights go down'. I think that's probably the most personal line on the whole album about her and Jay, because they are very real, and they're very much in love, and it must be pretty tough to have that love when you're incredibly famous.

"Ave Maria" is present on the I Am... disc of the double album I Am... Sasha Fierce, as it is a pop-R&B ballad that shows Beyoncé's insecurities about love, and the person she is "underneath all the makeup, underneath the lights and underneath all the exciting star drama". Beyoncé has said that she loves singing ballads because, "the music and the emotion in the story is told [sic] so much better. It's a better connection because you can hear it and it's not all these other distractions. I really wanted people to hear my voice and hear what I had to say." During an interview, Beyoncé revealed that "Ave Maria" was the most personal song to her on the whole album.

== Composition ==
"Ave Maria"
A 23-second sample of the chorus of "Ave Maria", featuring Beyoncé singing in a lower register with an operatic soprano as she impersonates a woman who feels alone despite being surrounded by her loved ones.

"Ave Maria" is a ballad that runs for 3 minutes and 42 seconds. The Village Voice's Nana Ekua Brew-Hammond described the song as being "opera-tinted". According to the sheet music published by EMI Music Publishing, it is written in the key of C Major with a slow tempo of 75 beats per minute and it is set in common time. The song samples Franz Schubert's "Ave Maria", however as noted by Leah Greenblatt of Entertainment Weekly, even though it "does riff on the classic aria, it's not an actual cover". The main instruments in "Ave Maria" include a piano and strings. Throughout the song, Beyoncé's voice shows restraint as she sings in a lower register with an operatic soprano that gives her more vocal power, as commented by Jennifer Vineyard of MTV News. Her vocal range spans from the music note of B_{3} to E_{5}. Lyrically, "Ave Maria" is about being surrounded by friends but still feeling alone, as conveyed by the lines, "How can the silence seem so loud?" and "There's only us when the lights go down". This view was echoed by Joey Guerra of the Houston Chronicle, who wrote that the song weaves "a vivid tale of a desperate woman".

== Critical reception ==
'Ave Maria'... pour[s] out in rapid succession... a powerful and emotionally stirring ballad with universal resonance; [it] signal[s] progression and maturity for Beyoncé the songwriter."
—David Rive, The Michigan Daily

"Ave Maria" garnered a mixed reception. While some praised Beyoncé's emotive vocals, others stated that her version was merely a normal take on the original. Joey Guerra of the Houston Chronicle commended the open-hearted emotion and the soft vocals that Beyoncé adopts on "Ave Maria", before adding that it is "a clever riff on the classic aria" and "a unique risk that pays off". Likewise, the Hartford Courant's Eric R. Danton, praised the rework of the classic aria, adding that Beyoncé's lyrics were an "elegant take on the timeless melody". Ryan Dombal of Pitchfork commented that Beyoncé's twist on the song is "vocally impeccable, but it reads more like recital fodder rather than a true confessional." Leah Greenblatt from Entertainment Weekly wrote that on the I Am disc there were some "lovely ballads" including "Disappear", the "soaring 'Halo' and 'Ave Maria'". Matos Michaelangelo of The A.V. Club wrote that "Beyoncé has a real flair for grandeur" and the "big, wide melodies of 'Halo' and 'Ave Maria' give her enough to work with that." Greg Kot of the Chicago Tribune commented that "Ave Maria" offers a "rare moment of comfort" and added that it "come[s] off as delicate as Beyoncé's emotions." Jim Farber of New York Daily News praised the song with its "operatic flourishes... [and] heavenly élan". In another review, he noted that the song was "by far her most melodically sure, and musically diverse, work". USA Today's Elysa Gardner chose "Ave Maria" as one of the songs to download from the album. While reviewing I Am... Sasha Fierce, a critic from People magazine noted that "the classically tinged 'Ave Maria,'... shows even more range [than 'If I Were a Boy']."

Spence D. of IGN Music praised "Ave Maria", writing that it shows Beyoncé in "crystal clear form" due to the mellow accompaniment that highlighted her "often captivating" voice. Darryl Sterdan, writing for the Canadian website Jam!, noted that Beyoncé "draws on the classic composition for this sweeping number" and echoes a similar line to John Lennon's quote: "Life is what happens to you while you're busy making other plans." Talia Kraines of BBC Online called the song "very strange, but wonderful". In his consumer guide, Robert Christgau wrote, "But me, I'm a hater, and thus I'm something like outraged, by not just those two pimp-outs but an 'Ave Maria' lacking even the dumbstruck literalism of Pink's rendition or the grotesque conversion of 'Umbrella' into 'Halo.'" Bernard Zuel of The Sydney Morning Herald wrote that the song was "pompous and frankly embarrassing". Colin McGuire of PopMatters commented that "Ave Maria" is a "pretty normal take, a piece that has simply been done too many times before to think Beyoncé would even have a shot at putting her stamp on it." Alexis Petridis of The Guardian described the song as "dreary". According to James Reed of The Boston Globe, the song is "an intriguing proposition torpedoed by a soggy arrangement". Adam Mazmanian of The Washington Times gave a negative review for the song, writing that the high notes included on "Ave Maria", "should have remained a secret between Beyonce and her producers". In 2013, John Boone and Jennifer Cady of E! Online placed the song at number ten on their list of ten best Beyoncé's songs. They further added, "The new classic kicks off with the plucking off some light strings and you know by the end you'll be singing through tears."

== Live performances ==
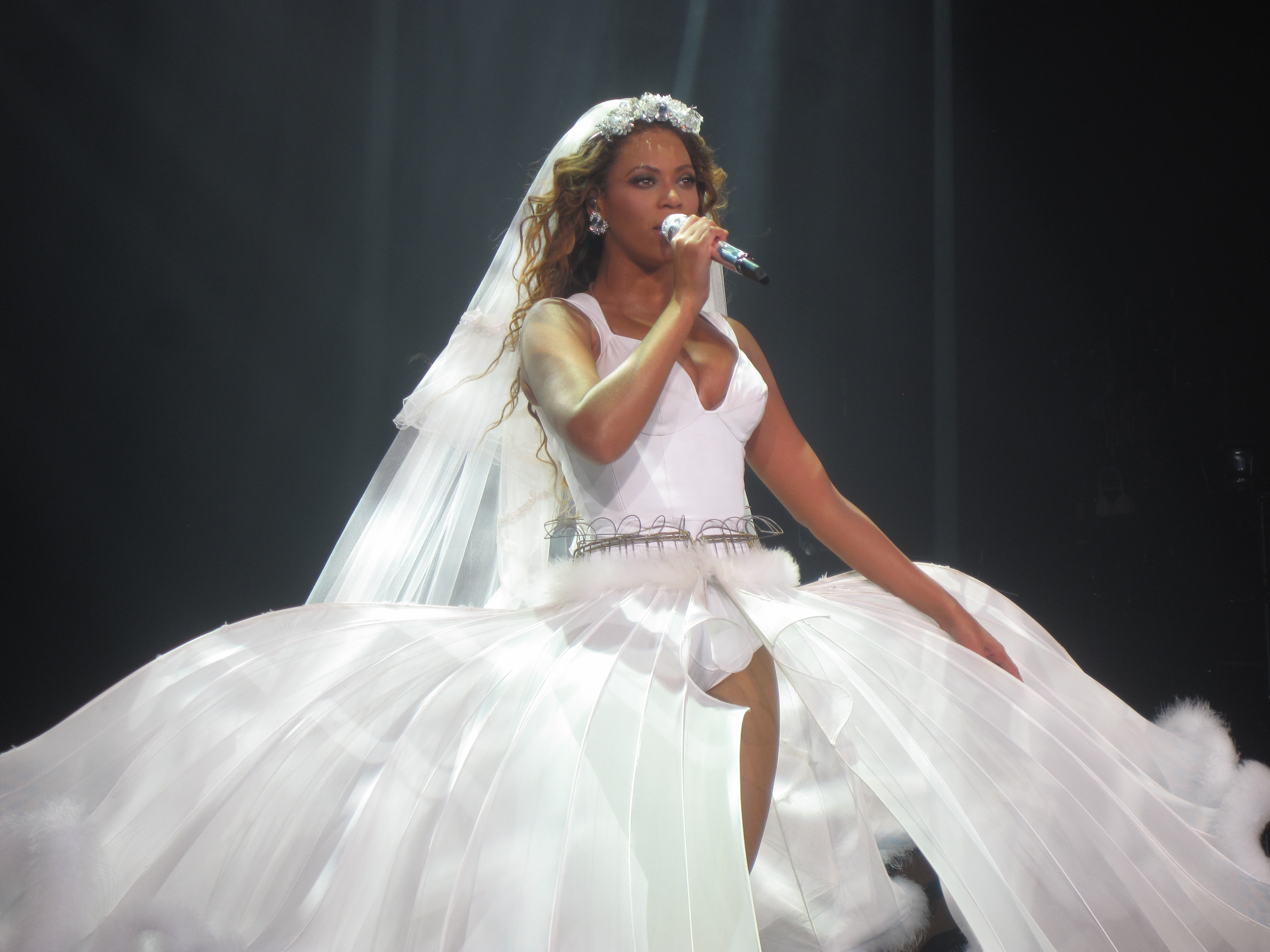
Beyoncé performing "Ave Maria" during her I Am... World Tour. During the performances she was dressed as a bride.

"Ave Maria" was a part of the set list during Beyoncé's I Am... World Tour (2009-2010), where she performed the song dressed in a wedding dress and blended it into Sarah McLachlan's "Angel" (1998). The wedding dress Beyoncé wore during the tour, was originally designed as a black dress and was designed by Thierry Mugler. Her mother and designer, Tina Knowles, made the dress stage-appropriate so Beyoncé could dance in it. When Beyoncé performed the song in Sunrise, Florida on June 29, 2009, animated graphics of turntables, faders, and other club gear throbbed behind her and her musicians. Beyoncé was accompanied by her two drummers, two keyboardists, a percussionist, a horn section, three backup vocalists called the Mamas and a lead guitarist, Bibi McGill. According to Parke Puterbaugh from News & Record, the strangest moment of the concert was Beyoncé's "unironic delivery" of "Ave Maria", for which she was attired in a wedding dress and veil.

Following Beyoncé's performance of the ballad at The O2 Arena in London, a writer for the newspaper Irish Independent commented that "an Irish audience surely cannot sit through the old convent staple 'Ave Maria' ... without feeling something cold squeeze the heart." Alice Jones of The Independent felt that the performance was an "exceedingly odd segment" during the tour. While reviewing Beyoncé's performance at the Madison Square Garden, a writer of People magazine compared her look with Madonna's. While reviewing another concert by Beyoncé, Ann Powers of Los Angeles Times also compared the performance with "pop's ultimate alpha female" Madonna at the 1984 MTV Video Music Awards. She also compared "Ave Maria" with the singer's 1989 song "Like a Prayer" because they both used religious imagery to elevate a romantic connection. A writer of Evening Chronicle praised the performance of the song during the tour, saying that it showed off Beyoncé's "incredible" vocals. MTV News' Jayson Rodriguez commented that Beyoncé uses her softer side while performing the ballad. Jim Farber of the Daily News praised the performance of the song, saying that "Beyoncé hit notes with a new delicacy, then moved seamlessly into the final operatic crescendo". Barbara Ellen of The Observer was negative about the performance of "Ave Maria" during the I Am... World Tour, comparing it with Challenge Anneka and bridezilla. She described it as "nonsense... [it] has no place in a Beyoncé show".

Beyoncé performed "Ave Maria" in Burswood Entertainment Complex, Perth, Western Australia, on September 25, 2009. Jay Hanna, writing for The Sunday Times, described the performance as "stunning". Jay Lustig of New Jersey On-Line described the same performance as "operatic". Holly Byrnes of The Daily Telegraph while reviewing another stop during the concert tour of Beyoncé in Australia wrote that her performance of the ballad "guaranteed to have raised the sails of the Sydney Opera House", while Patrick Emery of The Australian described her performance during another stop in the same country as "soaring". A live performance of "Ave Maria" is featured on Beyoncé's 2010 live album, I Am... World Tour. Andy Gill of The Independent, while reviewing the DVD, gave a negative review for the performance of the song, writing that "if her grotesque over-emoting on 'Ave Maria' is anything to go by, legibility could make things a lot worse." On December 3, 2008, Beyoncé's performance of "Ave Maria" at the Rockefeller Center, in New York, was broadcast on NBC. A writer from People magazine described her performance as "rousing". Beyoncé sang the song as a tribute to Michael Jackson at the 2008 Essence Music Festival. She later performed the song during the 2009 BET Awards, where she blended it with Sarah McLachlan's song "Angel" in honor to Michael Jackson, following his death. Beyoncé appeared in an angelic Balmain mini white dress, and according to a writer from The Daily Telegraph, she performed a "moving version" of "Ave Maria". A writer for the newspaper The Hindu commented that the performance of the song was "simultaneously sexy and angelic".

== Cover versions ==
On May 12, 2012, Molly Rainford, a contestant of the sixth season of Britain's Got Talent, sang "Ave Maria" during the show's final. Digital Spy's Daniel Sperling noted that Rainford sang a "pimped-up version" of the song which he called "incredible". A writer of BBC Online described her rendition as "moving". On May 28, 2012, Fatai Veamatahau sang "Ave Maria" on The Voice (Australia). Simon Holt of The Sydney Morning Herald noted that "she has a voice which brought tears to many eyes", including coach and mentor Seal's. Coach Joel Madden said: "I have to be respectful. That was a very spiritual performance. I'm not sure what it was like for people at home, but that felt electric in here". A reviewer for Take 40 Australia called it a "rousing version". Veamatahau's version peaked at number 25 on the Australian Singles Chart for the week of June 10, 2012.

== Credits and personnel ==
Credits are taken from I Am... Sasha Fierce liner notes.

- Beyoncé Knowles – songwriter, vocals
- Amanda Ghost – songwriter
- Ian Dench – songwriter, guitar
- Makeba Riddick – songwriter
- Mikkel S.Eriksen – songwriter, producer, recorder, other instrumentation
- Tor Erik Hermansen – songwriter, production, other instrumentation
- Mark "Spike" Stent – audio mixing
- Matt Green – audio mixing assistant
  - Recorded at Roc the Mic Studios, New York City, New York
  - Mixed at Record Plant, Los Angeles, California

== Charts ==
Following the album's digital release, "Ave Maria" debuted on the UK Singles Chart at number 150 on November 29, 2008. It also charted on the Portuguese Ringtone Chart in 2010 at number 16.

Chart performance for "Ave Maria"
Chart (2008–2023)	Peak position
Australian Singles Chart	90
France (SNEP)	160
Portuguese Ringtone Chart	6
UK Singles Chart	150

== Certifications ==
Region	Certification	Certified units/sales
Australia (ARIA)	Gold	35,000^{‡}
New Zealand (RMNZ)	Gold	7,500^{*}
United States (RIAA)	Gold	500,000^{‡}
^{*} Sales figures based on certification alone.^{‡} Sales+streaming figures based on certification alone.
