= Paco Menéndez =

Spanish computer programmer

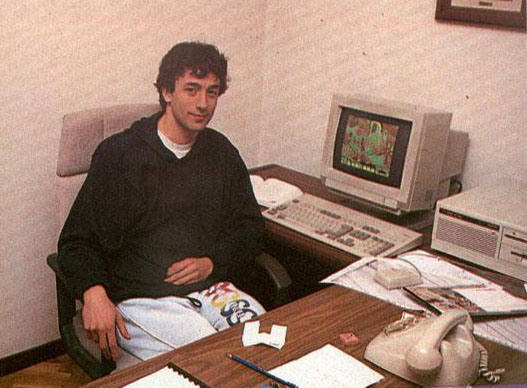
Paco Menéndez, 1989

Francisco "Paco" Menéndez (1965–1999) was a Spanish computer game programmer who wrote games for 8-bit computers. His most famous work is La abadía del crimen, which is regarded as one of the best games made for the ZX Spectrum.

== Early works ==
Menéndez's first work was Fred, an arcade maze game released in 1983 which was followed by a sequel, Sir Fred, in 1986. Both games were later distributed in the United Kingdom and translated into English. Quicksilva distributed Fred while Mikro-Gen handled Sir Fred's UK release. Both games were well received with critics, and Crash Magazine gave Sir Fred a 91 percent rating.

== La abadía del crimen ==
In 1988, Menéndez teamed with Juan Delcán to write La abadía del crimen (The Abbey of Crime) for Opera Soft. The game was to be a version of Umberto Eco's book The Name of the Rose but a license was not obtained as Eco never replied to Menéndez's request, so the game was renamed La abadía del crimen. Originally made for the Amstrad CPC, it was then ported to other 8-bit computers the ZX Spectrum and the MSX. The game was critically acclaimed for its graphics, sound and detail. The game helped Menéndez claim the Best Spanish Programmer award from Spanish Spectrum magazine MicroHobby. Despite its very positive critical reviews, and its moderate commercial success, the game was never officially released outside Spain.

== Aftermath ==
After La abadía del crimen, Menéndez left the scene in order to finish his degree in Telecom Engineering. It is believed that the progressive commercialism in the videogame market and bad experiences with Mikro-Gen's distribution of Sir Fred was Menéndez's reasons for his sudden departure. Though he only made three games, Menéndez is widely considered as one of Spain's greatest ever game programmers.

== Death ==
In 1999 Paco Menéndez committed suicide by jumping from his apartment in Sevilla. He was aged 34.
