= Livingstone, I Presume? (video game) =

Livingstone, I Presume
- Publisher: Alligata
- Designer: Opera Soft
- Platforms: Amstrad CPC, Amstrad PCW, Atari ST, Commodore 64, MS-DOS, MSX, Schneider CPC, ZX Spectrum
- Release: 1987
- Genre: Platformer

Livingstone, I Presume?, also released as Livingstone Supongo is a 1987 platformer video game. It was released for the Atari ST, Commodore 64, ZX Spectrum, Schneider CPC, MS-DOS and MSX.

== Overview ==
The player takes control of Stanley, a reporter who must venture into the African jungle in search of the lost missionary Dr. Livingstone. Stanley is equipped with a boomerang for activating hard to reach switches in temples, a dagger, a vaulting pole for jumping over gaps, and grenades. Players must collect food and water to maintain Stanley's energy as they progress through each of the game's seven levels. They must avoid hazards like booby traps, carnivorous plants and dangerous animals. In order to pass through the secret temple at the end of the final level, the player must collect five gems.

== Reception ==
At one point, it was the #1 game in Spain. A review from Computer and Video Games gave it a score of 7 for graphics, sound, value and playability. The review noted the game's fun and challenging gameplay, while noting that it lacked originality. Manfred Kleimann of Aktueller Software Markt gave the game a positive review for its graphics and gameplay. The Games Machine gave it a score of 69%, noting its moderate difficulty level.

A review from ACE praised its graphics and gameplay, comparing it positively to Jack the Nipper II: In Coconut Capers.

== Sequel ==
A sequel, Livingstone II, was released to mixed reviews.
