= Goody (video game) =

1988 video game

- Developer: Gonzalo Suárez Girard
- Publisher: Opera Soft
- Platforms: Amstrad CPC, Amstrad PCW, MS-DOS, ZX Spectrum, MSX
- Release: 1988
- Genre: Platform
- Mode: Single-player

Goody is a platform game developed by Gonzalo Suárez Girard and released in 1987 by the Spanish company Opera Soft. The game was released for Amstrad CPC, Amstrad PCW, MSX, ZX Spectrum, and for MS-DOS compatible computers.

Goody was the first video game by the Spanish designer Gonzalo Suárez Girard, who went on to make Commandos: Behind Enemy Lines.

== Plot ==
Four-color MS-DOS version

As an experienced thief, John Nelson Brainner Stravinsky, known as Goody, has a mission to bust into the Bank of Spain. Equipped with a ladder, Goody explores sewers and city buildings. Along the way, he may collect treasure needed to purchase tools such as dynamite or a drill and to find out the access code to the main vault. Goody has to tackle many objects and enemies that try to stop him, like remote-controlled combat helicopters, vipers, gorillas, ghosts, the policeman Rodríguez and the evil Moon.

== Legacy ==
Goody The Remake was released by Coptron Game Studios in 2007 for Microsoft Windows and Linux, and is now also available on Game Jolt.

An isometric spin-off game titled Goody Returns was published by eBrain Mobile in 2007.

Goody was re-released on Steam in March 2023.
