= Radio (Beyoncé song) =

2008 song by Beyoncé

Song by Beyoncé

from the album I Am... Sasha Fierce
- Recorded: 2008
- Studio: Roc the Mic Studios (New York, NY); The Boom Boom Room (Burbank, CA)
- Genre: Electropop; dance-pop
- Length: 3:38
- Label: Columbia
- Songwriters: Beyoncé Knowles; James "Jim Jonsin" Scheffer; Rico Love; Anton Bakholdin
- Producer: Jonsin

"Radio" is a song recorded by American singer Beyoncé for her third studio album, I Am… Sasha Fierce (2008). The up-tempo electropop/dance-pop song was composed by Beyoncé, Rico Love, Anton Bakholdin and Jim Jonsin. Composed in the key of D major and built essentially on bouncy beat, "Radio" also displays influences of the 1980s synthpop, Europop, and house. It is instrumentally complete with a Roland TR-808 drum, bass instruments, and synthesizers. The song's lyrics describe the love of Beyoncé in her childhood for the songs she used to listen to on the radio as she grew into an adult.

"Radio" received positive reviews from contemporary music critics, who generally praised Knowles's departure from her usual R&B style. Some of them also complimented the believability as well as the originality of the song and chose it as the standout track of I Am... Sasha Fierce. In September 2009, "Radio" was used to promote Dutch radio station Radio 538, and it subsequently charted for six weeks on the Dutch Top 40 chart, where it peaked at number 14. It also reached number five on its urban chart. "Radio" was part of Beyoncé's set list on her I Am... World Tour (2009–10) and was included on the live album I Am... World Tour (2010).

== Production and composition ==
"Radio"
A 21-second sample of "Radio", which is built bouncy beat, and contains elements of electro, synthpop, Europop, and house.

"Radio" was written by James Scheffer, Rico Love, Anton Bakholdin, and Beyoncé. Production was handled by Jim Jonsin, who also produced of "Sweet Dreams" (2009). "Radio" is different from the usual R&B material for which Beyoncé is known; It is an electropop/dance-pop song that exhibits influences of 1980s synthpop, Europop, and house. Following the release of I Am... Sasha Fierce, Beyoncé explained the concept behind the song on her official website:

It just seems like a feel-good record but when you really listen to the lyrics, it's about me growing up. In my household, I didn't go all of the parties and I didn't do all the things that a lot of the other teenage girls did because I was so in love with my radio and my music. I was so in love with this radio and my parents were happy that I was into something positive.

According to the sheet music published at Musicnotes.com by EMI Music Publishing, "Radio" is an uptempo song set in common time, written in the key of D major. It follows the chord progression of Bm–G–D–A/C♯ and Beyoncé's vocals span from the note of A_{3} to E_{5}. Built on a bouncy beat, "Radio" is instrumentally complete with a Roland TR-808 drum, bass instruments, and synthesizers. Several music critics, including Ben Westhoff of OC Weekly, noted that "Radio" bears resemblance to Rihanna's single "Umbrella" (2007) as they are both set to 1980s-style synthesizers." Similarly, James Reed of The Boston Globe wrote that "Radio" seems to be like the latest electro-pop confection from Rihanna. Darryl Sterdan of the Canadian website Jam! wrote that "Radio" sounds like a record Madonna would sing because of its electropop and dance-pop musical styles. Serbian newspaper Alo! suggested that the melody was plagiarized from "Aspirin" by Serbian singer Seka Aleksić, and claimed that the songwriters Filip Miletić and Miloš Roganović would sue Beyoncé; the claim was met with ridicule from other Serbian media.

The believability of the song's lyrics, which conveys love testaments as well as its timeless endurance, sung on sensual vocal arrangements by Beyoncé, who additionally adopts a sneering attitude, demonstrates her alter ego Sasha Fierce. Lyrically, "Radio" explores the relationship between Beyoncé as the female protagonist and the songs played on the radio, shown in the lyrics: "You're the only one that Papa allowed in my room with the door closed / We'd be alone / And Mama never freaked out when she heard it go boom / 'Cause she knew we were in the zone". Amy Linden of Vibe magazine felt that "Radio" could make an ideal "valentine" song because of its lyrical content.

== Critical reception ==
"Radio" received generally positive reviews from contemporary critics, who praised Knowles's brief departure from usual R&B style as well as the believability and originality of the song. Alexis Petridis of The Guardian noted that though the 1980s synthpop mode of "Radio" may not be as well suited to Beyoncé's voice as the old soul samples contained in "Crazy in Love" (2003) and "Suga Mama" (2007)", there is no denying that "Radio" is an "irresistible pop song". Colin McGuire of PopMatters highlighted Knowles's diversion from her usual R&B style, writing that "Radio" is "a bit of a novelty act " which takes Beyoncé in a new direction. He further wrote that the different elements of dance music present in the song makes it feel refreshing, before adding that "it might even suggest a more expansive, experimental side of the songstress on her follow-up". Talia Kraines of BBC Music wrote that "wild" "Radio" makes it the standout track on I Am... Sasha Fierce. Sal Cinquemani of Slant Magazine chose "Radio" as the highlight of both the standard and deluxe editions of I Am... Sasha Fierce, writing that it is the most convincing love song on the album.

James Reed of The Boston Globe described "Radio" as fun, bouncy, and ideal for a night at the club. Similarly, Leah Greenblatt of Entertainment Weekly wrote that the "spiky, Europop throb" of "Radio" expertly taunt the boys and fill the dance floor. Darryl Sterdan of Jam! was surprised by the new musical direction of Beyoncé but concluded that "... you better believe it ... it kinda works". Daniel Brockman of The Phoenix described "Radio" as the most believable song on the album, and complimented its "amid bland testaments to love's timeless endurance and the smut and thuggin[g] of the 'Sasha Fierce' persona, [which] is one with sensual overtones sung to an electronic device that, unlike men, 'never lets me down'". Echoing Brockman's sentiments, Amy Linden of Vibe magazine, who wrote that 1980's electropop and the sleek Valentine music of "Radio" tells the story of Beyoncé's alter ego. Similarly, Nana Ekua Brew-Hammond of The Village Voice wrote that "Radio" "show[s] [that] Sasha [is] just a good girl playing fierce". By contrast, Matos Michaelangelo of The A.V. Club said that "Radio" sounds like "shameless target-marketing" aiming at programming directors. On The Village Voice' 2008 year-end Pazz & Jop singles list, "Radio" was ranked at number 443.

== Credits and personnel ==
- Richard Butler, Jr. – producer, publisher, vocals producer, writer
- Jim Caruana – recorder, vocals recorder
- Matt Green – mixer assistant
- Beyoncé – vocals, writer
- Anton Bakholdin – writer
- James Scheffer – producer, recorder, writer
- Mark "Spike" Stent – mixer

== Promotion and chart performance ==
Beyoncé performed "Radio" on her I Am... World Tour (2009–10). The song was subsequently included on the live album I Am... World Tour, as the thirteenth track. In early September 2009, "Radio" was used to promote Dutch radio station 'Radio 538'. On September 19, 2009, "Radio" debuted on the Dutch Top 40 at number 31 after it was used to promote the local radio station. After three weeks, it peaked of number 14 on October 10, 2009, and charted for six weeks. "Radio" also peaked at number five on the Dutch urban chart.

| Chart (2009) | Peak position |
|---|---|
| Dutch Top 40 | 14 |
| Dutch Urban Chart | 5 |
| Netherlands (Single Top 100) | 75 |
