= Opera Soft =

Spanish video game developer

- Company type: Defunct
- Industry: Video games
- Founded: 1986
- Headquarters: Spain

Opera Soft was a Spanish computer game developer of the Golden Era of Spanish Software of the 1980s. It released many games for the ZX Spectrum, Amstrad CPC and similar computers in the mid-1980s, but its games were not as popular on the PC. Founded in 1986, the company obtained success with its title Livingstone Supongo (Livingstone, I Presume) in the same year. The game is based on the 19th-century explorer Dr. Livingstone. Within Spain, one of its most popular games was La Abadía del Crimen (The Abbey of Crime), based on Umberto Eco's novel The Name of the Rose.

Like many other Spanish software companies of the time, Opera Soft did not adapt to the generational change and went out of business in the early 1990s with the emergence of 16-bit video games.

== Opera Sports ==
Opera created a division to develop sports videogames called Opera Sports.

== Notable games ==
- Cosa Nostra (1986)
- Livingstone Supongo (1986 - José Antonio Morales Ortega / Carlos A. Díaz de Castro)
- The Last Mission (1987)
- La abadía del crimen (1988 - Paco Menéndez / Juan Delcán)
- Goody (1988 - Gonzo Suárez / Carlos A. Díaz de Castro)
- Sol negro (1988 - Gonzo Suárez / Carlos A. Díaz de Castro / Juan Giménez López)
- Mutan Zone (1989)
- Solo (1989)
- Trigger (1989)
- Corsarios (1989)
- Gonzzalezz (1989)
- Guillermo Tell (1989)
- Ulises (1989)
- Mot (1989 - Gonzo Suárez / Carlos A. Díaz de Castro / Alfonso Azpiri)
- Livingstone Supongo II (1989 - José Antonio Morales Ortega and José Ramón Fernández Maquieira / Carlos A. Díaz de Castro)
- Mithos (1990)
- Mundial de Fútbol (1990)
- Golden Basket (1990 - Eduardo Bellver Castaño and José Vicente Pons Alonso / Queral y J. Alberto Ochoa Fernández)
- Ángel Nieto Pole 500 (1990)
- Poli Díaz, also known as Boxing Simulation (1990 - Juan Carlos García, Kostandin Igor Ruiz, J. Alberto Ochoa Fernández, Miguel Kruskritz)
- Soviet (1990)
- Rescate en el golfo (1990)
- Sirwood (1990)
- La Pulga 2 (1991)
- Jai Alai (1991)
- Olympic Games '92 (1992)
- La colmena (1992)

== Legacy ==
A video game called Speakerman was released in 2019 with art style and game world heavily inspired by Goody and Livingstone Supongo, citing those Opera Soft games as direct inspirations.
