= Ave Maria (Schubert) =

1825 composition by Franz Schubert

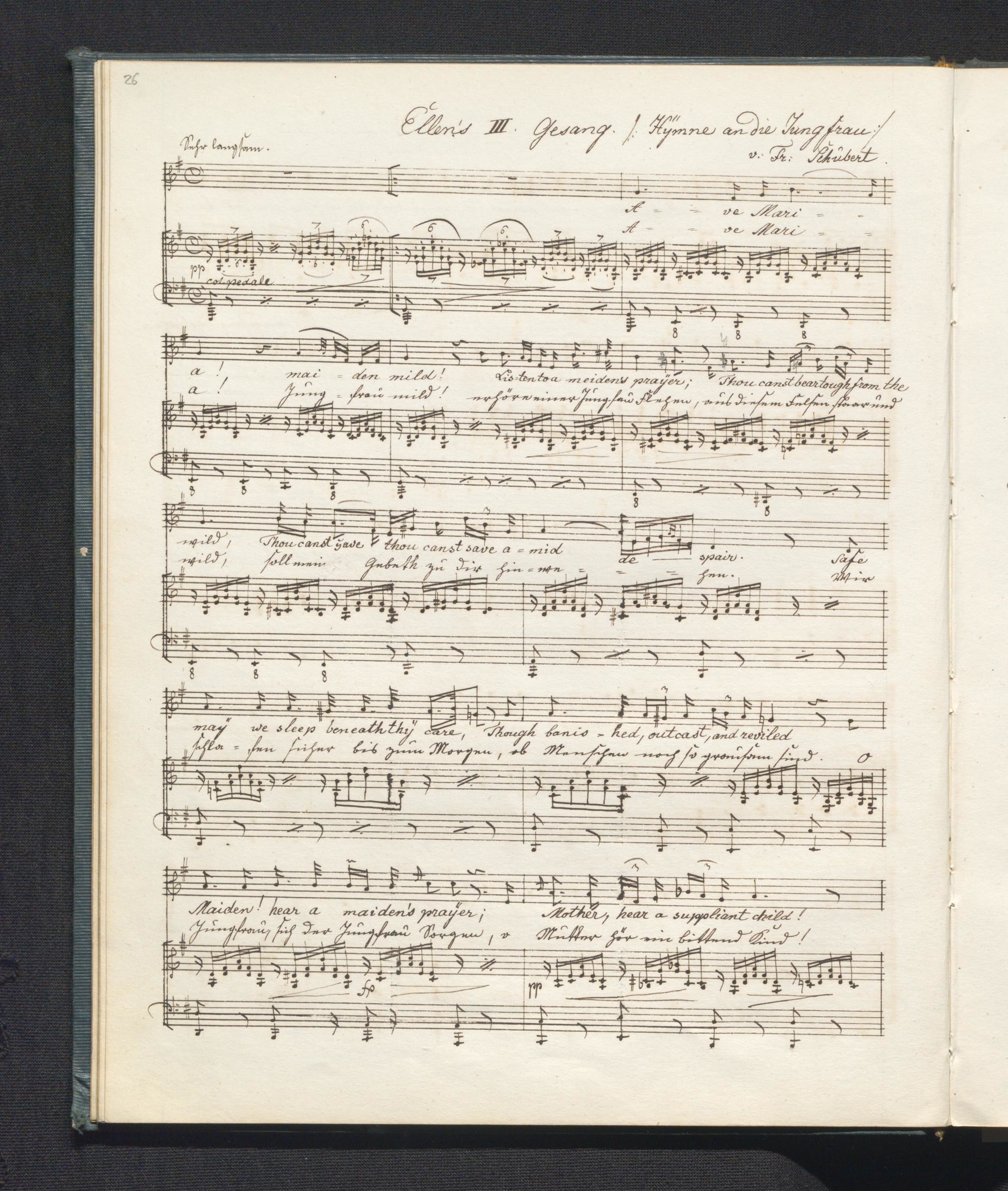
Manuscript of "Ellens Dritter Gesang" from 1843 - 1851.

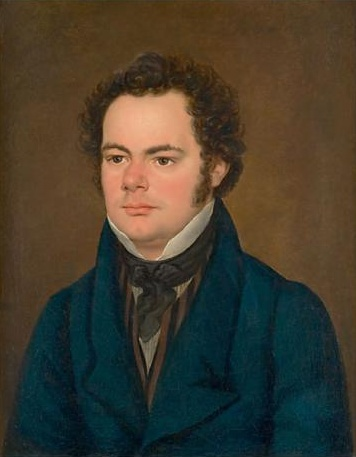
Portrait of Franz Schubert by Franz Eybl (1827)

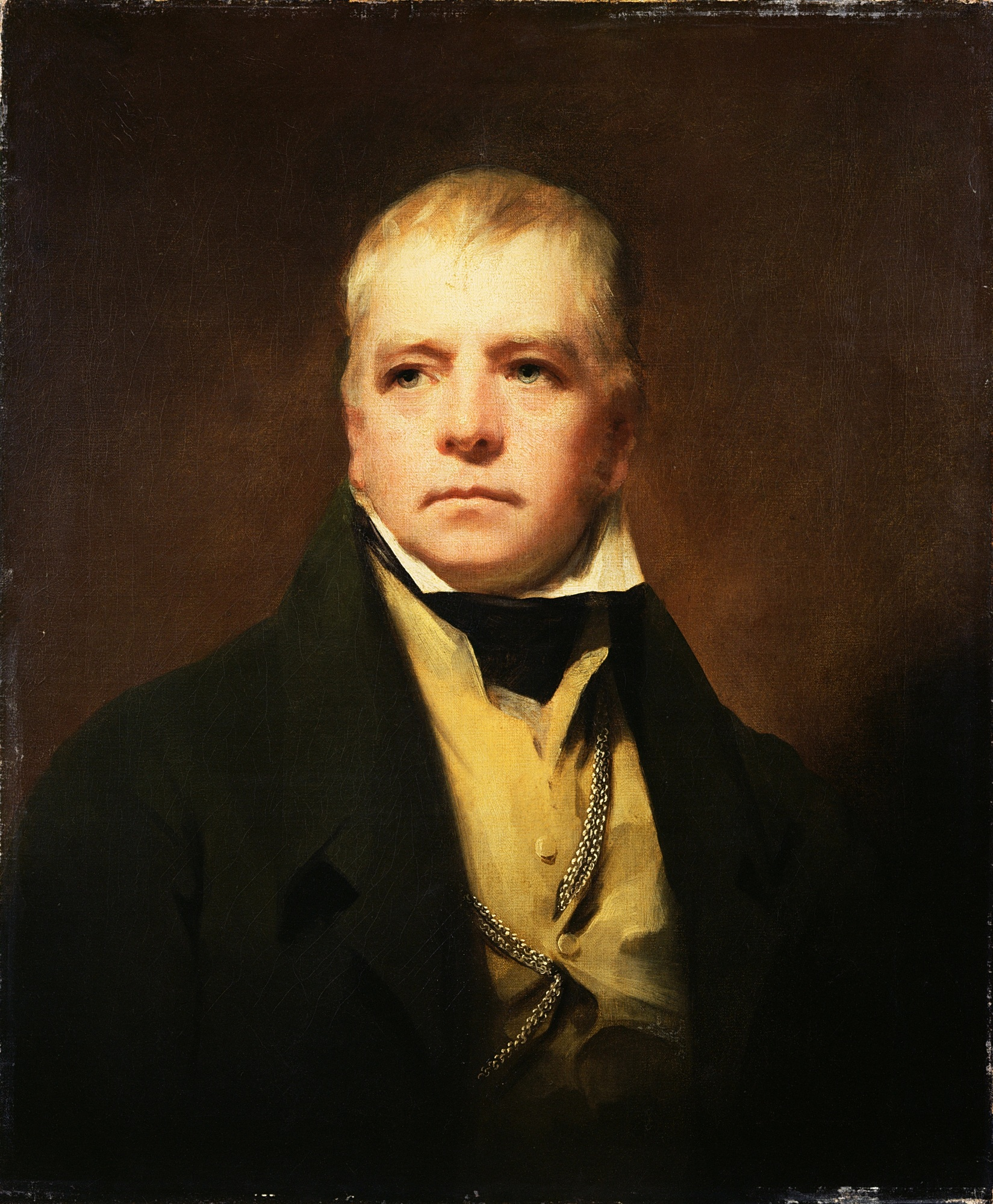
Walter Scott

"Ellens dritter Gesang" ("Ellens Gesang III", D. 839, Op. 52, No. 6, 1825, English: "Ellen's Third Song"), is a work composed by Franz Schubert in 1825. It is part of a setting of seven songs from Walter Scott's 1810 popular narrative poem The Lady of the Lake, in which the character Ellen Douglas sings a prayer addressed to the Virgin Mary.

Beyond the song as originally composed by Schubert, it is also performed as "Ave Maria", the Latin name of the prayer Hail Mary. "Ave Maria" is presented in musically simplified arrangements and with various lyrics that commonly differ from the original context of the poem. It was arranged in three versions for piano by Franz Liszt.

== The Lady of the Lake and the "Ave Maria" ==
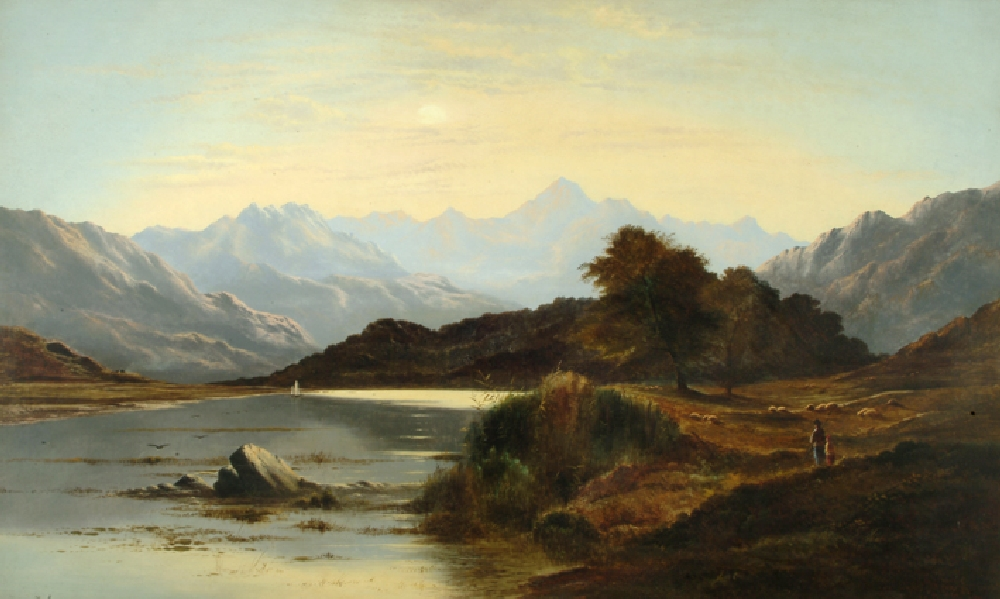
1879 painting of Ellen's Isle, Loch Katrine

The piece was composed as a setting of a song (verse XXIX from Canto Three) from Walter Scott's popular narrative poem The Lady of the Lake, in a German translation by Adam Storck (1780–1822), and thus forms part of Schubert's Liederzyklus vom Fräulein vom See. In Scott's poem, the character Ellen Douglas, the Lady of the Lake (Loch Katrine in the Scottish Highlands), has gone with her exiled father to stay in the Goblin's cave as he has declined to join their previous host, Roderick Dhu, in rebellion against King James. Roderick Dhu, the chieftain of Clan Alpine, sets off up the mountain with his warriors, but lingers and hears the distant sound of the harpist Allan-bane, accompanying Ellen who sings a prayer addressed to the Virgin Mary, calling upon her for help. Roderick Dhu pauses, then goes on to battle.

Schubert's setting is said to have first been performed at the castle of Countess Sophie Weissenwolff in the little Austrian town of Steyregg and dedicated to her, which led to her becoming known as "the lady of the lake" herself.

The opening words and refrain of Ellen's song, namely "Ave Maria" (Latin for "Hail Mary"), may have led to the idea of adapting Schubert's melody as a setting for the full text of the traditional Roman Catholic prayer, "Ave Maria". The Latin version of the "Ave Maria" is now so frequently used with Schubert's melody that it has led to the impression that he originally wrote the melody as a setting for the "Ave Maria" prayer.

== Position within the cycle ==
In 1825, Schubert composed a selection of seven songs from Scott's The Lady of the Lake. They were published in 1826 as his Opus 52.

The songs are not intended for a single performer: the three songs of Ellen are for a woman's voice with piano accompaniment, while the songs for Norman and Malcolm Graeme were intended for the baritone Johann Michael Vogl. Of the remaining two songs, one was for a male ensemble and the other for a female ensemble.

1. "Ellens Gesang I", D. 837, Raste Krieger, Krieg ist aus / "Soldier rest! the warfare o'er"
2. "Ellens Gesang II", D. 838, Jäger, ruhe von der Jagd / "Huntsman, rest! thy chase is done"
3. "Bootgesang" (Hail to the Chief), D. 835, Triumph, er naht / "who in triumph approaches", for male voice quartet
4. "Coronach" (Deathsong of the women and girls), D. 836, Er ist uns geschieden / "He is gone to the mountain", for female choir
5. "Normans Gesang", D. 846, Die Nacht bricht bald herein ("Night will soon be falling")
6. "Ellens Gesang III" (Hymne an die Jungfrau / Hymn to the Virgin), D. 839, Ave Maria! Jungfrau mild / "Ave Maria! maiden mild!"
7. "Lied des gefangenen Jägers", D. 843, Mein Roß so müd / "My steed is tired"

Schubert composed the songs to the German texts. However, the songs were apparently intended to be published with the original English texts as well. This meant finding correspondences to Storck's sometimes quite free translations, which entailed significant difficulties.

== Lyrics ==
"Ellens dritter Gesang"
Mezzo-soprano Dorothea Fayne, Uwe Streibel (piano)

Storck's translation used by Schubert

Ave Maria! Jungfrau mild,
Erhöre einer Jungfrau Flehen,
Aus diesem Felsen starr und wild
Soll mein Gebet zu dir hinwehen.
Wir schlafen sicher bis zum Morgen,
Ob Menschen noch so grausam sind.
O Jungfrau, sieh der Jungfrau Sorgen,
O Mutter, hör ein bittend Kind!
Ave Maria!

Ave Maria! Unbefleckt!
Wenn wir auf diesen Fels hinsinken
Zum Schlaf, und uns dein Schutz bedeckt,
Wird weich der harte Fels uns dünken.
Du lächelst, Rosendüfte wehen
In dieser dumpfen Felsenkluft.
O Mutter, höre Kindes Flehen,
O Jungfrau, eine Jungfrau ruft!
Ave Maria!

Ave Maria! Reine Magd!
Der Erde und der Luft Dämonen,
Von deines Auges Huld verjagt,
Sie können hier nicht bei uns wohnen.
Wir woll'n uns still dem Schicksal beugen,
Da uns dein heil'ger Trost anweht;
Der Jungfrau wolle hold dich neigen,
Dem Kind, das für den Vater fleht.
Ave Maria!

"Hymn to the Virgin" by Sir Walter Scott

Ave Maria! maiden mild!
Listen to a maiden's prayer!
Thou canst hear though from the wild;
Thou canst save amid despair.
Safe may we sleep beneath thy care,
Though banish'd, outcast and reviled –
Maiden! hear a maiden's prayer;
Mother, hear a suppliant child!
Ave Maria!

Ave Maria! undefiled!
The flinty couch we now must share
Shall seem with down of eider piled,
If thy protection hover there.
The murky cavern's heavy air
Shall breathe of balm if thou hast smiled;
Then, Maiden! hear a maiden's prayer,
Mother, list a suppliant child!
Ave Maria!

Ave Maria! stainless styled.
Foul demons of the earth and air,
From this their wonted haunt exiled,
Shall flee before thy presence fair.
We bow us to our lot of care,
Beneath thy guidance reconciled;
Hear for a maid a maiden's prayer,
And for a father hear a child!
Ave Maria!

Latin Catholic prayer version

Ave Maria, gratia plena,
Maria, gratia plena,
Maria, gratia plena,
Ave, Ave, Dominus,
Dominus tecum.
Benedicta tu in mulieribus, et benedictus,
Et benedictus fructus ventris (tui),
Ventris tui, Jesus.
Ave Maria!

Sancta Maria, Mater Dei,
Ora pro nobis peccatoribus,
Ora, ora pro nobis;
Ora, ora pro nobis peccatoribus,
Nunc et in hora mortis,
In hora mortis nostrae.
In hora, hora mortis nostrae,
In hora mortis nostrae.
Ave Maria!

Hail Mary, full of grace,
Mary, full of grace,
Mary, full of grace,
Hail, Hail, the Lord
The Lord is with thee.
Blessed art thou among women, and blessed,
Blessed is the fruit of thy womb,
Thy womb, Jesus.
Hail Mary!

Holy Mary, Mother of God,
Pray for us sinners,
Pray, pray for us;
Pray for us sinners,
Now, and at the hour of our death,
The hour of our death.
The hour, the hour of our death,
The hour of our death.
Hail Mary!

The Schubert version repeats words and phrases to get them to fit into his melody.

== Use in Fantasia (1940) ==
Walt Disney used Schubert's song in the final part of his 1940 film Fantasia, where he linked it to Modest Mussorgsky's Night on Bald Mountain in one of his most famous pastiches. The end of Mussorgsky's work blends with almost no break into the beginning of Schubert's song, and as Deems Taylor remarked, the bells in Night on Bald Mountain, originally meant to signal the coming of dawn, which cause the demon Chernabog to stop his dark worship and the ghosts to return to the grave, now seem to be church bells signalling the beginning of religious services. A procession of monks is shown walking along. The text for this version is sung in English, and was written by Rachel Field. This version also had three stanzas, like Schubert's original, but only the third stanza made it into the film (one line in the last stanza is partially repeated to show how it is sung in the film):

Ave Maria!
Now your ageless bell
so sweetly sounds for listening ears,
from heights of Heaven to brink of Hell
in tender notes have echoed through the years.
Aloft from earth's far boundaries
Each poor petition, every prayer,
the hopes of foolish ones and wise
must mount in thanks or grim despair.
Ave Maria!

Ave Maria!
You were not spared
one pang of flesh, or mortal tear;
So rough the paths your feet have shared,
So great the bitter burden of your fear.
Your heart has bled with every beat.
In dust you laid your weary head,
the hopeless vigil of defeat was yours
and flinty stone for bread
Ave Maria!

Ave Maria!
Heaven's Bride.
The bells ring out in solemn praise,
for you, the anguish and the pride.
The living glory of our nights, of our nights and days.
The Prince of Peace your arms embrace,
while hosts of darkness fade and cower.
Oh save us, mother full of grace,
In life and in our dying hour,
Ave Maria!

The version heard in Fantasia was arranged by Leopold Stokowski especially for the film, and unlike the original, which is for a solo voice, is scored for soprano and mixed chorus, accompanied by the string section of the Philadelphia Orchestra. The soloist is Julietta Novis.

== See also ==
- "Ave Maria" by German composer Johann Sebastian Bach and French composer Charles Gounod
- "Ave Maria" by Russian composer Vladimir Vavilov, often misattributed to Italian composer Giulio Caccini
- "Ave Maria" by American R&B artist Beyoncé, a modern re-written rendition featured on her album I Am... Sasha Fierce.
