= Why Don't You Love Me (Beyoncé song) =

2010 song by Beyoncé

Single by Beyoncé

from the album I Am... Sasha Fierce
- Released: June 11, 2010
- Recorded: 2008
- Studio: Music World (Houston); Roc the Mic (New York)
- Genre: R&B
- Length: 3:37
- Label: Columbia
- Songwriters: Beyoncé Knowles; Solange Knowles; Angela Beyincé; Eddie Smith III; Jesse Rankins; Jonathan Wells
- Producers: Beyoncé Knowles; Bama Boyz

Beyoncé singles chronology
"Telephone" (2010)	"Why Don't You Love Me" (2010)	"Run the World (Girls)" (2011)

Music video
- "Why Don't You Love Me" on YouTube

"Why Don't You Love Me" is a song by American singer Beyoncé from her third studio album, I Am... Sasha Fierce (2008). It was written by Beyoncé, Angela Beyincé, Solange Knowles and the Bama Boyz and produced by the Bama Boyz and Beyoncé. "Why Don't You Love Me" is an R&B song with disco influences that is set in a retro style. According to its lyrics, Beyoncé questions her love interest about why he does not value her fabulousness. Its 1960s-styled music video was directed by Melina Matsoukas and Beyoncé under the alias Bee-Z, and it stars the latter as "B.B. Homemaker". Beyoncé pays homage to Bettie Page in the video, which critics universally commended for its 1960s style sets and costumes. They also complimented Beyoncé for her acting skills.

"Why Don't You Love Me" was well received by critics. It topped the United States Hot Dance Club Songs chart for one week in February 2010, a little over one year after the original release of I Am... Sasha Fierce. On August 27, 2010, the song was released as a single in the United Kingdom. It eventually charted at number 51 on the UK Singles Chart and at number 14 on its R&B Singles Chart. Although not being released elsewhere, "Why Don't You Love Me" garnered some attention in Australia, where it charted at number 73; it bubbled under the main charts of Belgium and reached number 44 on Slovakia Airplay Chart. In the US, it emerged as the nineteenth most played track in dance clubs in 2010. "Why Don't You Love Me" was a part of Beyoncé's set list for her historic headlining 2011 Glastonbury Festival Performance, the Revel Presents: Beyoncé Live revue, the Mrs Carter Show World Tour, the On the Run Tour, and the Cowboy Carter Tour.

== Development and production ==
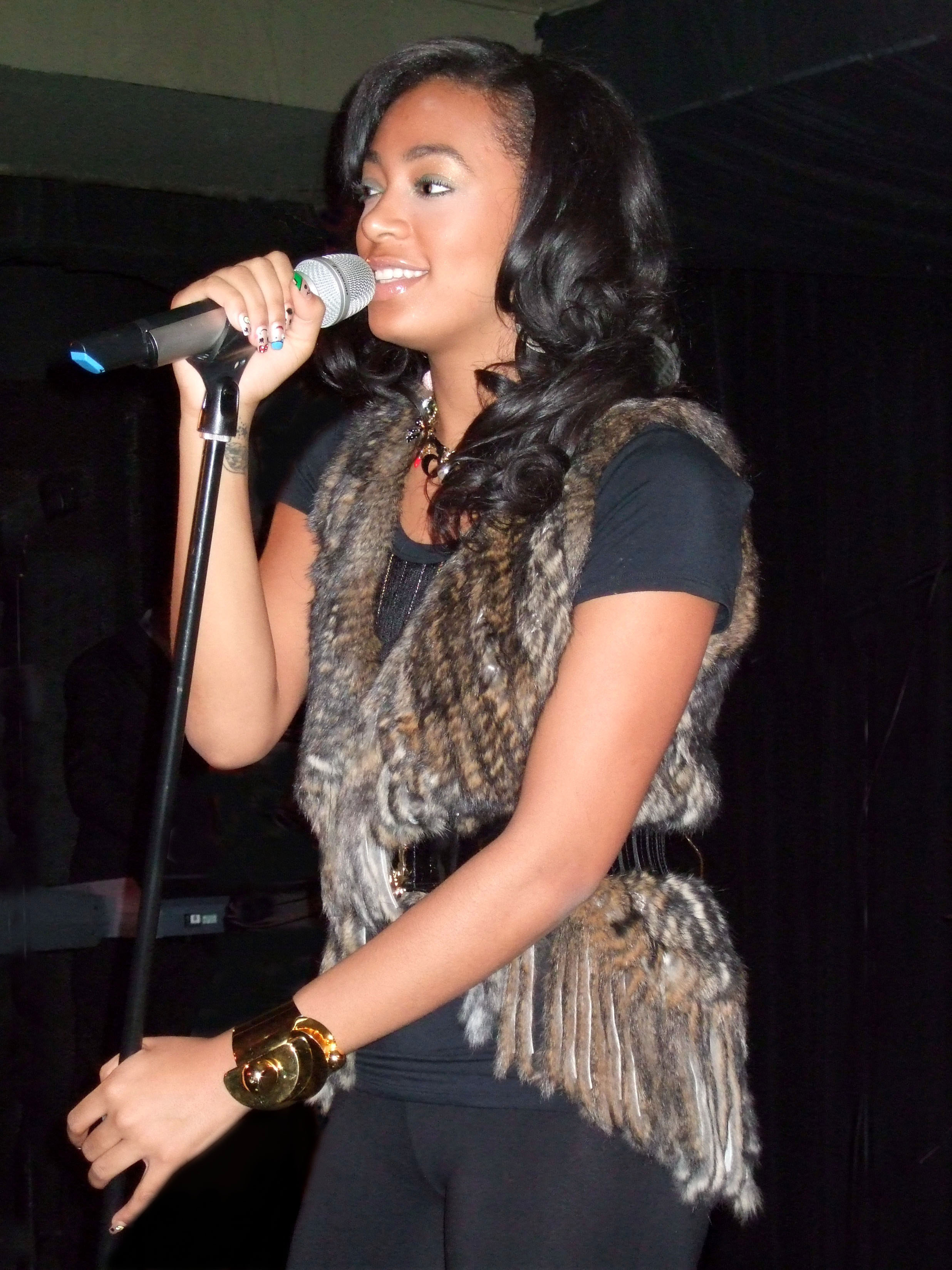
Solange Knowles (pictured) co-wrote "Why Don't You Love Me".

"Why Don't You Love Me" was written by Beyoncé, Solange Knowles, Angie Beyincé and produced as well as co-written by the Bama Boyz. Jonathan Wells of Bama Boyz said that they decided to try something different from what they usually do, by mixing several genres for "Why Don't You Love Me". The song's inspiration came from the time they spent in London at the end of The Beyoncé Experience tour in promotion of her second studio album B'Day (2006). The writing and production of the song began in London and was finished stateside in early 2008. They admitted that the song's structure was unusual, however they were happy that it ended up in Beyoncé's hands. After the Bama Boyz produced two tracks on Solange's second studio album Sol-Angel and the Hadley St. Dreams (2008), she asked them to put instrumentals together for her to write for her sister Beyoncé.

The Bama Boyz almost intentionally left the instrumental for "Why Don't You Love Me" out, since they thought that the song did not sound like the tracks Beyoncé was recording for her upcoming album, at that particular time. However, Jesse Rankins explained that they later decided to put the instrumental for "Why Don't You Love Me" in the email because they knew that Solange likes weird records, but, they made sure to send it last. Out of all the mainstream-inspired attempts the Bama Boyz sent to Solange, she eventually chose that last and most unexpected track and penned "Why Don't You Love Me". Jonathan Wells commented: "When they heard Solange's demo, we were excited because that track was more our true sound than any of the others [sent], but we still kinda didn't believe Beyoncé would cut it...but we hoped!"

Beyoncé came to Houston's Music World Studios for a recording session a few months after Solange had cut the demo. Beyoncé invited the Bama Boyz into her session at Music World Studios to listen to the early versions of I Am... Sasha Fierce. Unexpectedly, after Beyoncé played "Halo", "Why Don't You Love Me" came blasting through the speakers with Beyoncé singing the song. The Bama Boyz were thrilled that she recorded it and loved the song. In a 2013 interview, Solange stated: "I actually wrote 'Why Don't You Love Me' for my sister and it was one of those things where I had just been in a relationship situation where I was just not getting it and then it just came very naturally."

According to Anti-Music, the song was nearly discarded twice; the first time was when EMI Music prepared a demo of the song to send to other artists without knowing that Beyoncé had already recorded the song, and the second came during the track selection of I Am... Sasha Fierce's track listing, where executives felt that the song did not fit in with the other records.

== Composition ==
"Why Don't You Love Me"
A sample of the song featuring Knowles asking her love interest why he does not love her despite her fabulousness.

"Why Don't You Love Me" is different from Beyoncé's previous dance-pop songs as it makes use of a retro style. It is an upbeat track that draws from the genre of R&B. The song also contains elements of up-tempo disco and funk music. It consists of energetic tribal beats, a drum loop, funky guitars and a bassline that was designed to make it a groovy and dance song. According to the lyrics of "Why Don't You Love Me", Beyoncé impersonates a woman who questions her love interest about the reason for which he does not value her fabulousness, convincing him she's the best thing for him as she sings: "Why don't you love me... when I make me so damn easy to love?... I got beauty... I got class... I got style and I got ass...". The singer further tells her love interest that the decision not to choose her is "entirely foolish".

== Release and reception ==
Originally released as a Walmart and iTunes Store bonus track on I Am... Sasha Fierce, the song was later released on the platinum edition and digital reissues of the album in certain areas, and finally as a bonus track along with "Poison" and a remixed version of "Video Phone" featuring pop singer Lady Gaga on a digital EP titled I Am... Sasha Fierce – The Bonus Tracks. The song was also released as a promotional single on September 22, 2009. On July 2, 2010, "Why Don't You Love Me" was digitally released in Germany while its music video was included on a separate digital EP that went on sale the same date. Two remixes of the song were later made available for download in the United Kingdom on August 29, 2009.

Chris Ryan of MTV called "Why Don't You Love Me" a "dirty, disco-funk track." Maura Johnston of The Village Voice called "Why Do You Love Me" "the stankface tour de force bonus track from I Am... Sasha Fierce in which Beyoncé reminds a dude that she's pretty much the greatest thing around and his choice to not be with her is an entirely foolish one." She further praised the song, writing, "It's one of the best songs in her catalog, being as it is a four-minute summation of why she's one of pop's premier stylists right now; her vocals are equal parts pleading and snarling, the twitchy disco-funk beat gets hips shaking, and the declarations of confused self-love throughout can cause the listener to both root for her and realize that they've been in similar situations." On The Village Voice' 2010 year-end Pazz & Jop singles list, "Why Don't You Love Me" was ranked at number 549.

== Chart performance ==
It managed to top the US Billboard Hot Dance Club Play chart for the week of February 13, 2010. It became Beyoncé's twelfth number-one hit on that chart and it was also the fifth consecutive song from I Am... Sasha Fierce to reach number one on the same chart. On June 11, 2010, "Why Don't You Love Me" debuted at number 73 on the Australian Singles Chart. However the following week, the song fell down to the position number 91, before dropping out of the chart the following week. "Why Don't You Love Me" stayed under the main charts in Belgium, reaching number 10 on the Flemish Ultratip chart.

On August 14, 2010, "Why Don't You Love Me" debuted at number 142 on the UK Singles chart, and it moved from number seventy-one to number 40 on the R&B chart. After the digital release of remixes, the song rose to number 71 on the UK Singles chart, becoming the ninth consecutive single off I Am... Sasha Fierce to peak within the top 75. It also moved from number 44 to number 25 on its R&B chart on September 11, 2010. The following week, on September 18, 2010, "Why Don't You Love Me" moved up twenty places on the UK Singles to land at number 51 and ascended to number 14 on its R&B chart.

== Music video ==
=== Filming and concept ===
The music video for the song was directed by long-time collaborator Melina Matsoukas and Beyoncé under the alias Bee-Z. The video took two-three weeks of preparation and one day to film in Los Angeles on Mount Olympus. The main set of the video was a house owned by a wealthy 95-year-old man who allowed Beyoncé and Matsoukas to use his house and collectible cars for the video shoot. During an interview with USA Today on January 28, 2010, Beyoncé announced that she would be taking a break from her music career saying "to live life, to be inspired by things again". She was then inspired to shoot a music video for the bonus track. In an interview with People magazine in August 2010, Beyoncé explained: "I came up with the concept for that video because lately I decided to take a break, and I’ve been home, being a wife. I figured it could be nice to give a little wink toward the things that I’ve been doing, so that’s why I’m a housewife in the video." However, she explained that the video is "an exaggerated, over-the-top version" of what she was doing right then, just living her life, being a woman at home, relaxing and trying to enjoy her life other than performing and creating music. For instance, dusting off her Grammys and getting under the hood of a car while wearing six-inch heels are not regular occurrences for Beyoncé.

=== Release ===
"Why Don't You Love Me" is the ninth video from I Am... Sasha Fierce era. On May 1, 2010, a forty-second clip starring Beyoncé as B.B. Homemaker, was posted on Vimeo. In the sneak peek, she is seen wearing an unbuttoned blue shirt with a pair of short denim shorts and a red handkerchief on her headwears while trying to fix a broken-car. The complete video premiered on May 4, 2010, and it is nearly five minutes long. The music video was officially released to iTunes Stores in the United States on May 18, 2010, two weeks after its original premiere. In May 2010, the media reported that Beyoncé's decision to release one more video from her album I Am... Sasha Fierce just before Kelly Rowland released "Commander" was unfair on Rowland. These claims would be denied by Rowland who said that despite the clip for "Why Don't You Love Me" airing several days before "Commander", the media was "making too much of a big deal of release schedules and trying to create a feud where it doesn't exist." She also told Hip Hop Hollywood:

"We all came out at the same time and it really doesn't matter ... I think there's room for everybody ... There's B, there's Ciara putting something out and GaGa putting something out, but, because we started out together, people are going to say things like that. But I really don't care, I love her 'til our dying days and that's all that counts.

=== Synopsis and analysis ===
The video begins with a tribute and sample of the opening credits of Leave It to Beaver which is overdubbed to introduce Beyoncé as "B.B. Homemaker" in a Daisy Dukes style outfit. The song begins once she goes inside a house and brings along a board saying "Why Don't You Love Me". Throughout the video, Beyoncé is seen crying, with mascara running down her cheeks while talking on the phone to her love interest, drinking a dry martini and smoking a cigarette. This projects an image of Beyoncé paying homage to Bettie Page just as she did in the music videos for "Telephone" and "Video Phone", where she collaborated with Lady Gaga. In this scene, Beyoncé impersonates Betty Draper. According to Melanie Bertoldi of Billboard magazine, Knowles contends to her deadbeat lover while sipping a cocktail and French-inhaling a cigarette in the music video. The fantasy-laden imagery hardly ends there though, as it is followed by shots of sequences of Beyoncé gardening, washing dishes, scrubbing floors, and baking cookies. Rap-Up commented on what happens in the video, saying that she is also reading during some scenes, in which she sings "Keep my head in them books, I'm sharp..." In the middle of the video, Beyoncé dusts off her mantlepiece, which is covered by her 16 Grammy awards she earned when she was with Destiny's Child and after the debut of her solo career. The video closes on her falling to the floor after hanging up the phone and finishing her martini, and says the final word "...dumb!" in a scene in which she is dressed in a dominatrix-type outfit while holding a whip.

=== Reception ===
The music video received general acclaim from critics. Jon Caramanica of The New York Times described the video as one of Beyoncé's best and most vivid. Brad Wete of Entertainment Weekly described Beyoncé as "one hot housewife in the ['Why Don't You Love Me'] video". This was echoed by Tray Hova of Vibe magazine who stated that "Beyoncé makes a mighty fine housewife". Jayson Rodriguez of MTV News said that she did her best impersonation of Betty Draper. The Music Network complimented the production of the video while simultaneously making reference to Christina Aguilera and criticising the latter for her new video for her single "Not Myself Tonight", writing: "...housework has never looked so good ... Proving you don't have to wear bondage gear and a ball-gag to be sexy (hello Christina!), the [19]50s-style video sees the R&B queen [Beyoncé] getting dirty in a different way: dusting her Grammys, watering the plants and scrubbing the shower in vintage lingerie... She can come over to our house anytime." Melanie Bertoldi of Billboard magazine commented on Beyoncé's "dominatrix costume" at the end to Rihanna's Rated R era. She finally complimented the music video by saying that "Beyoncé's shamelessly campy performance—complete with boatloads of running mascara—is generously refreshing." Chris Ryan of MTV Buzzworthy noted that the video was "kind of a tour de force" and compared it with the one for "Telephone" (2010). He also noted that it showed "Beyoncé on the edge of a nervous breakdown."

Amy Odell of New York magazine praised the video and noted that "the crazy twitchy behavior she exhibited in 'Telephone' returns to much delight, but with a wardrobe that's pure housewife instead of cold-blooded drag-queen murderer." Odell also praised the playsuits in the video, which according to here were "a classier, more mature version of 'tards." In another review, Odell concluded "It would be easy to credit the look of Beyoncé's new video to Lady Gaga's influence." Francesca Stabile of The Village Voice gave a positive review for the video, writing, "The retro-glam outfits, the oversized martini glass, the rolling around on the bed sobbing with eye makeup running down her face... this is our favorite Bey[oncé] video ever. No one else can make doing household chores (dusting Grammys!) simultaneously look this good and this sad." Daniel Kreps of Rolling Stone magazine described the video as a "Douglas Sirk film through the eyes of David LaChapelle" and noted that several scenes looked like Beyoncé was being photographed for Vogue magazine on the set of The Brady Bunch. He concluded that "If Beyoncé was lobbying for a temptress role on Mad Men, 'Why Don't You Love Me,'... would make the perfect audition reel."

=== Recognition ===
Becky Bain of Idolator described Beyoncé as "adorable and funny" in the nostalgic, 60s-inspired video for "Why Don't You Love Me". She also said that her retro-style is "supercute" and charming. On August 3, 2010, Bain claimed that "Why Don't You Love Me" is one of the videos that should have been nominated for Video of the Year at the 2010 MTV Video Music Awards, and she later said on September 8, 2010, that the clip for "Why Don't You Love Me" should have been nominated instead that of "Video Phone", in the category for Best Female Video at the 2010 MTV Video Music Awards. "Why Don't You Love Me" also made number nine in Rap-Up's Best Videos of 2010. In February 2012, Kat George of VH1 placed the video at number one on her list of "The 6 Best Sets of Devastated Raccoon Eyes in Music Video History", writing, "Beyoncé wins best panda eyes on the strength of melodrama... and because she looks really hot in vintage style lingerie. Clearly tortured, Beyoncé's panda eyes are paired with martinis, cigarettes, and just the right amount of crazy to make the whole thing unbearably sexy." In 2013, John Boone and Jennifer Cady of E! Online placed the video at number three on their list of Beyoncé's ten best music videos, writing, "It's like a trip back in time. Except with sexier outfits, which were definitely missing from the '60s. So good call, Beyoncé! You can even upgrade history!". In January 2010, the video garnered a nomination in the category of Outstanding Music Video at the 42nd NAACP Image Award.

=== Lawsuit ===
Philip Markowitz, a neighbor of the man on whose property the video was filmed, filed a lawsuit on May 28, 2010, in Los Angeles seeking $25,000. He sued Beyoncé, the companies "Klener & Company" and "Bags and Boards", and Dina Ciccotello, for the video shoot for "Why Don't You Love Me". Markowitz complained that during the morning, every time he tried leaving his house, the crew was blocking his driveway. Markowitz claims that he "missed several business calls while arguing calmly in his driveway". According to him: "[He] demanded compensation for the trespass on his property and the inconvenience and delay he had already suffered." The case was later dismissed by a superior court judge in September.

== Live performances ==
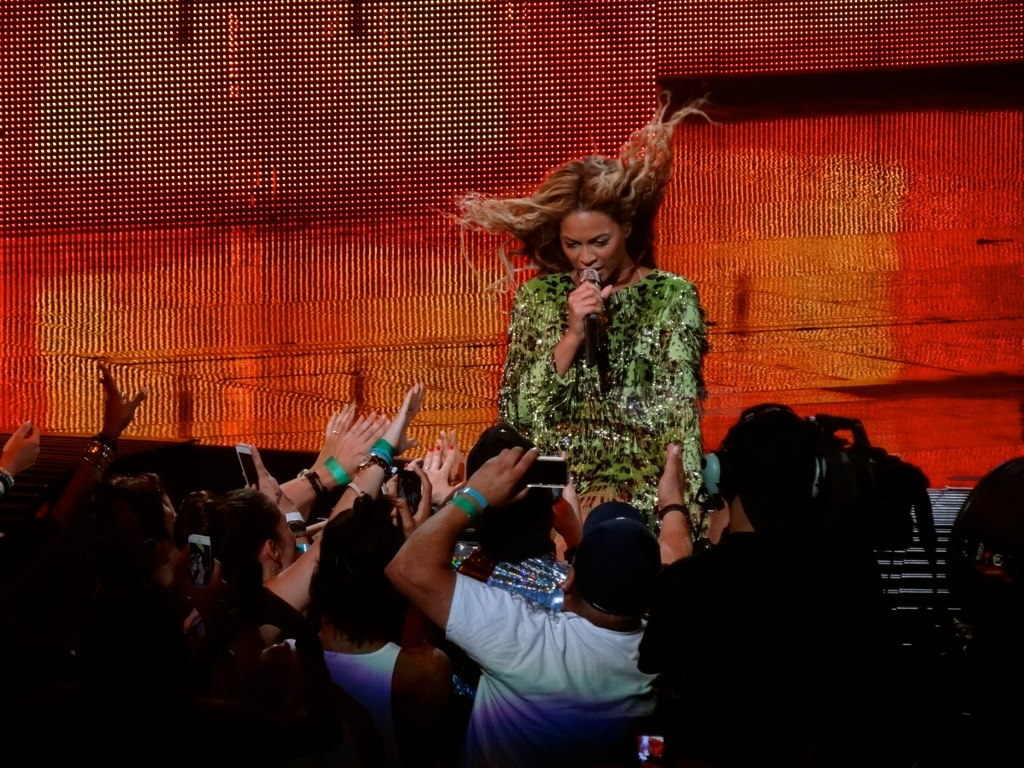
Beyoncé performing "Why Don't You Love Me" on her The Mrs. Carter Show World Tour, 2013

Beyoncé performed "Why Don't You Love Me" live for the first time the 2011 Glastonbury Festival on June 26, 2011. During the performance she danced with her male backup dancers and the official video of the song was played on a screen behind them. Later, in May 2012, Beyoncé performed a funky version of the song as a part of her revue show Revel Presents: Beyoncé Live in Atlantic City, New Jersey at Revel. While reviewing the show, Ben Ratliff of The New York Times wrote: "Then she makes some of the most thorough and gold-plated declarations of self-worth ever rendered in pop. 'There’s nothing not to love about me,' she sang... without needing to make a joke out of it." Maura Johnston of The Village Voice was also positive about the performance of the song, saying, "Live, she threw herself into the track, from tsk-tsk-tsk opening to impassioned ending; after that, the song's frenetic beat got transformed into an extended outro that showcased her band's prowess in such a convincing way, she took off her shoes to dance along with it." "Why Don't You Love Me" was included in the set list of Beyoncé's The Mrs. Carter Show World Tour (2013–2014).

The song was performed during Beyoncé and Jay-Z's co-headlining On the Run Tour (2014). Throughout the performance of the song, Beyoncé stopped performing several times watching the crowd while fans were blowing her hair. Rebecca Thomas of the MTV News felt that the performance of the song "seemed to reopen old wounds". Kat Bein from the Miami New Times described the performance as one of the most dramatic moments of the concert further hailing it as "one of the rawest things we've ever seen at a stadium show".

The song was also performed as part of her Cowboy Carter Tour in 2025, alongside "Ya Ya".

== Use in visual media and Grace Potter's cover ==
In her second commercial for HDTV manufacturer Vizio, Beyoncé is shown battling herself for a guy's attention. The mini video was set to "Why Don't You Love Me" and it was directed by Jake Nava, who previously directed music videos for Beyoncé's "Crazy in Love" (2003) and "Single Ladies" (2008) amongst others. Beyoncé explained the concept of the commercial to Rap-Up, "The concept today is basically someone's watching the television and I've decided to step in their living room and perform especially for them. The TV looks so wonderful, they're ignoring me so I'm stepping it up and I'm trying to perform harder and it doesn't matter, the TV is better." The spot premiered on Thanksgiving Day on November 24, 2010. A writer of Rap-Up commented that Beyoncé "[brought] her alter ego Sasha Fierce back from the dead", and that she faces her "toughest competition yet—herself."

In late April 2011, Grace Potter from the American rock band Grace Potter and the Nocturnals sang a rootsy acoustic rendition of "Why Don't You Love Me" along with strategic handclaps and drummer Matthew Burr's backbeat. Potter said that choosing to cover "Why Don't You Love Me" was easy because she is "big-voiced". She elaborated: "As I was watching the video, I was watching for the visual candy. Then I slowly began falling in love with the song." Jessica Letkemann of Billboard magazine complimented the cover, writing: "[the band] may usually rock with a 60s feel while Texas-born Beyoncé is a queen of R&B, but one thing the two women undoubtedly have in common is an amazing set of pipes."

== Personnel ==
Credits are taken from I Am... Sasha Fierce's liner notes.

- Vocals – Beyoncé Knowles
- Producers and recorded by – Bama Boyz, Beyoncé Knowles
- Vocal production – Beyoncé Knowles
- Writers – Beyoncé Knowles, Solange Knowles, Angela Beyince, Eddie Smith III, Jesse Rankins and Jonathan Wells

== Charts ==
=== Weekly charts ===
Chart (2010)	Peak position
Australia (ARIA)	73
Belgium (Ultratip Bubbling Under Flanders)	10
Brazil (Hot 100 Airplay)	21
Germany (Deutsche Black Charts)	4
Global Dance Tracks (Billboard)	21
Poland Dance (ZPAV)	48
Poland (Polish Airplay TV)	3
Slovakia Airplay (ČNS IFPI)	44
UK Singles (Official Charts)	51
UK Hip Hop/R&B (Official Charts)	14
US Dance Club Songs (Billboard)	1

=== Year-end charts ===
Chart (2010)	Position
US Dance Club Songs (Billboard)	19

== Release history ==
Release dates and formats for "Why Don't You Love Me"
Region	Date	Format(s)	Label(s)	Ref.
Italy	June 11, 2010	Radio airplay	Sony Music	
Germany	July 2, 2010	Digital download; digital download (EP)	Sony Music	
United Kingdom	August 27, 2010	Digital download (remixes)	RCA	

== See also ==
- List of number-one dance singles of 2010 (U.S.)
