= Poison (Beyoncé song) =

2008 song by Beyoncé

Song by Beyoncé

from the album I Am... Sasha Fierce
- A-side: "Broken-Hearted Girl" "Video Phone"
- Recorded: 2007–08
- Studio: Roc the Mic studio (New York City, New York)
- Length: 4:05
- Label: Columbia
- Songwriters: Johntá Austin; Mikkel S. Eriksen; Tor Erik Hermansen; Beyoncé Knowles
- Producers: StarGate; Knowles

"Poison" is a song that was recorded by American singer Beyoncé for the 2009 deluxe edition of her third studio album, I Am… Sasha Fierce (2008) and the EP titled I Am... Sasha Fierce – The Bonus Tracks (2009). It was written by Johntá Austin, Mikkel S. Eriksen and Tor Erik Hermansen of the production team Stargate and Beyoncé while the production was handled by the later two. The song leaked online in August 2009 prior to the release of the deluxe edition of I Am… Sasha Fierce. During that month, it was included on a mixtape by DJ Haze titled Big R&B Ego.

"Poison" is a slow-tempo song in which the female protagonist talks about a bad relationship that she cannot abandon. It received mostly positive reviews from critics who noted that although the song was cut out of the track-listing of the standard edition of the album, it was a solid track. Following the release of the EP I Am... Sasha Fierce – The Bonus Tracks in Korea, the song peaked at number one on the South Korea Gaon International Chart during the week ending February 7, 2010.

== Background ==
"Poison" was written by Johntá Austin, Mikkel S. Eriksen and Tor Erik Hermansen of the production team Stargate and Beyoncé for her third studio album I Am… Sasha Fierce (2008). It was produced by Stargate and Beyoncé while the audio mixing was done by Carlos Otanedel and Damien Lewis at Soapbox Studios in Atlanta. The instrumentation of the song was provided by Stargate at the Roc the Mic studio in New York and the recording was done by Mikkel S. Eriksen. Jim Caruana also worked on the recording of the song.

Prior to the official premiere of the song on I Am... Sasha Fierce, "Poison" was included on a mixtape by DJ Haze which was called Big R&B Ego. This version was leaked on the Internet in August 2009. "Poison" was not included on the track-listing of the standard version of I Am... Sasha Fierce; it was included on a re-issue of the deluxe edition of the album instead, which was released on November 23, 2009. An extended play (EP) titled I Am...Sasha Fierce – The Bonus Tracks was also released on the same date in several countries featuring new songs including "Poison", "Why Don't You Love Me" and a remix of "Video Phone" featuring Lady Gaga. "Poison" later became an A-side to the European single release of "Broken-Hearted Girl" and an EP release of "Video Phone" both in 2009.

== Composition and critical reception ==
"Poison" is a slow-tempo song with hundred beats per minute. It was composed using common time in the key of G major. Beyoncé's vocals range from the low note of G_{3} to the high note of D_{5}. In the song, Beyoncé sings about a relationship that she knows is not good for her, but still one that she cannot give up. "Poison" is complete with stuttering beats coupled with the singer's "liquidy" voice as stated by Sonya Eskridge of Sister 2 Sister magazine.

A writer of Rap-Up magazine noted that the remix of the song which was featured on the mixtape Big R&B Ego was "potent, but not quite fatal". Eskridge of Sister 2 Sister wrote in her review of the song that "we can't help but wonder why it would have been cut". Matthew Richardson of Prefix Magazine noted, "As far as songs that got left in the studio, 'Poison' actually isn't that bad. The song's production isn't loud enough for this to be a single, but Beyonce sounds fine here." Nia Beckwith of the website AllHipHop gave a positive review about the song, saying that it was "the most noteworthy" track she heard during the week of its premiere. She wrote,

The overall theme of the song puts me in the mind of a hit from R&B group Bell Biv Devoe circa 1990 that was also titled Poison, but doesn't fair the potential to be a number one song like it did close to 20 years ago. Even though the song doesn't seem like it would be a chart topper it does seem album worthy. It's something most can relate to if you've ever been in a relationship. Beyonce sings about a failed relationship that's no good, but yet is so hard to walk away from and ends up being just like Poison.

Recording artist Nicki Minaj discussed the song during an interview with Rap-Up magazine, saying "When I tell you it gives me life, like, it gives me life. Her voice is effortless. It's badass, like, 'I know I'm the best.' I love the melody, I love the cadence. It's playful, but it's just so in-your-face. It's dope and it's creative."

== Credits and personnel ==
Credits are taken from the liner notes of the re-issue of the deluxe edition of I Am... Sasha Fierce.

- Written by Beyoncé Knowles, Mikkel S. Eriksen and Tor Erik Hermansen
- Produced by Stargate and Beyoncé
- All instruments by Mikkel S. Eriksen and Tor Erik Hermansen
- Recorded by Mikkel S. Eriksen at Roc the Mic, New York
- Additional vocals recorded by Jim Caruana at Roc the Mic, New York
- Mixed by Phil Tan assisted by Josh Houghkirk
- Audio engineering by Carlos Oyanedel and Damien Lewis at Soapbox Studios, Atlanta

== Charts ==
After the release of I Am... Sasha Fierce – The Bonus Tracks, "Poison" became very popular in Korea and reached the top position of the South Korea Gaon International Chart during the week ending February 7, 2010. It was the ninety-eighth best-selling track of 2010 selling 128,009 units.

Chart (2010)	Peak position
South Korea Gaon International Chart	1
