= List of number-one international songs of 2010 (South Korea) =

The Gaon Digital Chart is a chart that ranks the best-performing international songs in South Korea. The data is collected by the Korea Music Content Association. Below is a list of songs that topped the weekly, monthly, and yearly charts, as according to the Gaon 국외 (Foreign) Digital Chart. The Digital Chart ranked songs according to their performance on the Gaon Streaming, Download, BGM, and Mobile charts.

== Weekly charts ==
Sales before the year 2011 were not released.

| Date | Song | Artist |
|---|---|---|
| January 2 | "Tik Tok" | Kesha |
| January 9 | "Tik Tok" | Kesha |
| January 16 | "Telephone" | Lady Gaga featuring Beyoncé |
| January 23 | "Slow Motion" | Karina |
| January 30 | "Slow Motion" | Karina |
| February 6 | "Tik Tok" | Kesha |
| February 13 | "Poison" | Beyoncé |
| February 20 | "Tik Tok" | Kesha |
| February 27 | "Tik Tok" | Kesha |
| March 6 | "Blah Blah Blah" | Kesha |
| March 13 | "Blah Blah Blah" | Kesha |
| March 20 | "Nothin' on You" | B.o.B featuring Bruno Mars |
| March 27 | "Nothin' on You" | B.o.B featuring Bruno Mars |
| April 3 | "Nothin' on You" | B.o.B featuring Bruno Mars |
| April 10 | "Nothin' on You" | B.o.B featuring Bruno Mars |
| April 17 | "Nothin' on You" | B.o.B featuring Bruno Mars |
| April 24 | "Nothin' on You" | B.o.B featuring Bruno Mars |
| May 1 | "Nothin' on You" | B.o.B featuring Bruno Mars |
| May 8 | "Nothin' on You" | B.o.B featuring Bruno Mars |
| May 15 | "Nothin' on You" | B.o.B featuring Bruno Mars |
| May 22 | "Nothin' on You" | B.o.B featuring Bruno Mars |
| May 29 | "Nothin' on You" | B.o.B featuring Bruno Mars |
| June 5 | "Nothin' on You" | B.o.B featuring Bruno Mars |
| June 12 | "Tell Me Goodbye" | BIGBANG |
| June 19 | "Nothin' on You" | B.O.B featuring Jay Park |
| June 26 | "Nothin' on You" | B.O.B featuring Jay Park |
| July 3 | "Nothin' on You" | B.O.B featuring Jay Park |
| July 10 | "Love the Way You Lie" | Eminem featuring Rihanna |
| July 17 | "Love the Way You Lie" | Eminem featuring Rihanna |
| July 24 | "Love the Way You Lie" | Eminem featuring Rihanna |
| July 31 | "Love the Way You Lie" | Eminem featuring Rihanna |
| August 7 | "Love the Way You Lie" | Eminem featuring Rihanna |
| August 14 | "Love the Way You Lie" | Eminem featuring Rihanna |
| August 21 | "Love the Way You Lie" | Eminem featuring Rihanna |
| August 28 | "DJ Got Us Fallin' in Love" | Usher featuring Pitbull |
| September 4 | "DJ Got Us Fallin' in Love" | Usher featuring Pitbull |
| September 11 | "Because of You" | Kelly Clarkson |
| September 18 | "Because of You" | Kelly Clarkson |
| September 25 | "Give a Little More" | Maroon 5 |
| October 2 | "Give a Little More" | Maroon 5 |
| October 9 | "Give a Little More" | Maroon 5 |
| October 16 | "Because of You" | Kelly Clarkson |
| October 23 | "Because of You" | Kelly Clarkson |
| October 30 | "Like a G6" | Far East Movement featuring Dev & The Cataracs |
| November 6 | "Like a G6" | Far East Movement featuring Dev & The Cataracs |
| November 13 | "Like a G6" | Far East Movement featuring Dev & The Cataracs |
| November 20 | "Like a G6" | Far East Movement featuring Dev & The Cataracs |
| November 27 | "Like a G6" | Far East Movement featuring Dev & The Cataracs |
| December 4 | "Like a G6" | Far East Movement featuring Dev & The Cataracs |
| December 11 | "Like a G6" | Far East Movement featuring Dev & The Cataracs |
| December 18 | "Like a G6" | Far East Movement featuring Dev & The Cataracs |
| December 25 | "Like a G6" | Far East Movement featuring Dev & The Cataracs |
| December 31 | "Love Letter" | R. Kelly |

== Monthly charts ==
| Month | Song | Artist |
|---|---|---|
| January | "Slow Motion" | Karina |
| February | "Tik Tok" | Kesha |
| March | "Nothin' on You" | B.o.B featuring Bruno Mars |
| April | "Nothin' on You" | B.o.B featuring Bruno Mars |
| May | "Nothin' on You" | B.o.B featuring Bruno Mars |
| June | "Nothin' on You" | B.o.B featuring Jay Park |
| July | "Love the Way You Lie" | Eminem featuring Rihanna |
| August | "Love the Way You Lie" | Eminem featuring Rihanna |
| September | "Because of You" | Kelly Clarkson |
| October | "Like a G6" | Far East Movement featuring Dev & The Cataracs |
| November | "Like a G6" | Far East Movement featuring Dev & The Cataracs |
| December | "Like a G6" | Far East Movement featuring Dev & The Cataracs |

== Year-end chart ==
| Rank | Song | Artist(s) |
|---|---|---|
| 1 | "Nothin' on You" | B.o.B featuring Bruno Mars |
| 2 | "Love the Way You Lie" | Eminem featuring Rihanna |
| 3 | "Tik Tok" | Kesha |
| 4 | "Because of You" | Kelly Clarkson |
| 5 | "Nothin' on You" | B.o.B featuring Jay Park |
| 6 | "I'm Yours" | Jason Mraz |
| 7 | "Baby" | Justin Bieber featuring Ludacris |
| 8 | "Telephone" | Lady Gaga featuring Beyoncé |
| 9 | "Like a G6" | Far East Movement featuring Dev & The Cataracs |
| 10 | "Shots" | LMFAO featuring Lil Jon |
