= Bama Boyz =

American hip hop group

The Bama Boyz
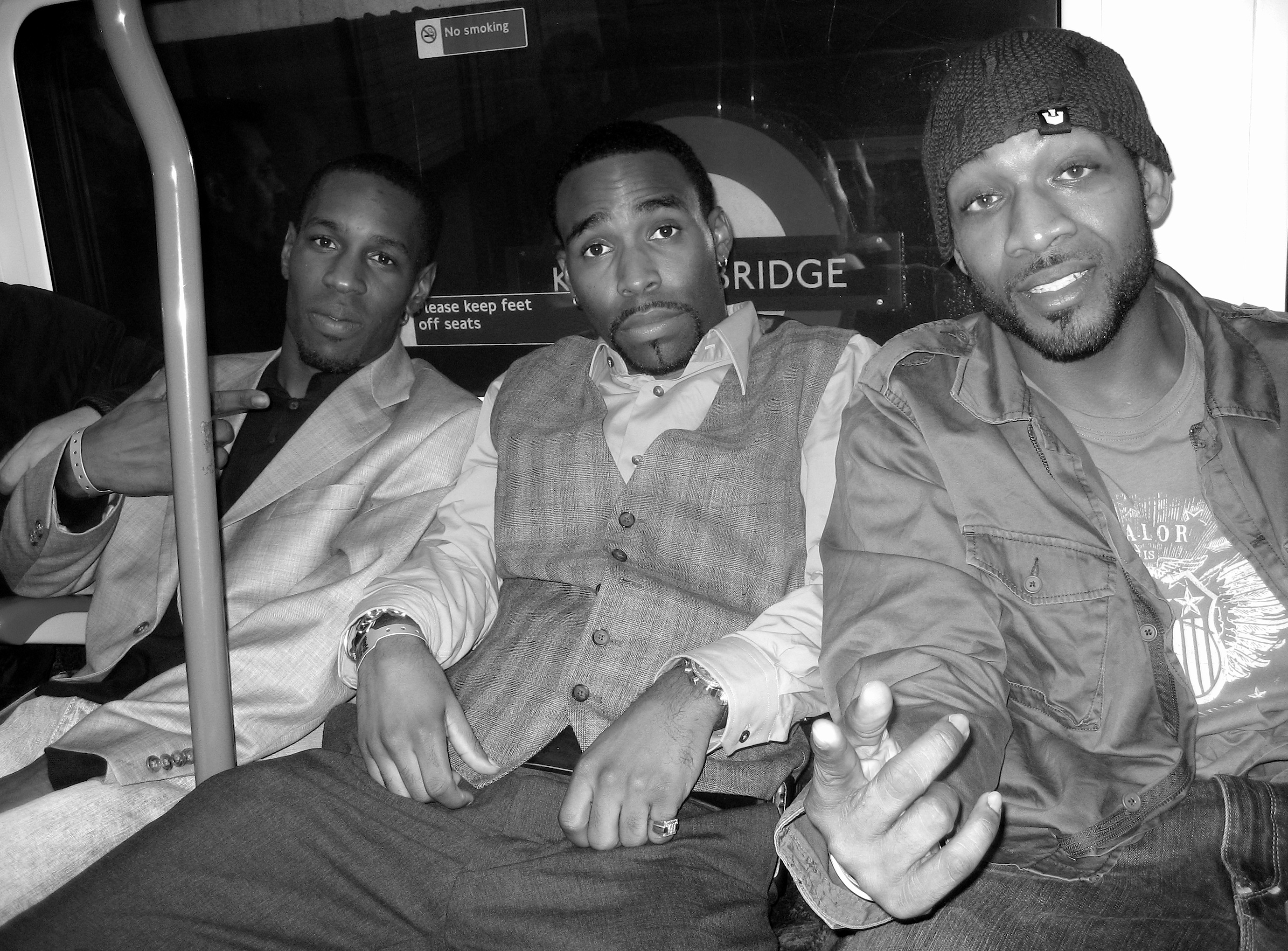

Background information
- Also known as: The Bamaz, Bama Boys, Bamaz
- Origin: Montgomery, Alabama
- Genres: Electro, Hip hop, Pop, R&B, Dance
- Occupation: Producers
- Instruments: Drum, keyboards, synthesizers, Sequencer, Guitar
- Years active: 2003-present
- Labels: My Turn Entertainment, LLC
- Members: Eddie "E-Trez" Smith III, Jesse J. Rankins, Jonathan D. Wells
- Website: TheBamaz.com

The Bama Boyz (a.k.a. the Bamaz) are an American record production, songwriting, and artist trio. They consist of Eddie "E-Trez" Smith III, Jesse J. Rankins, Jonathan D. Wells. Professionally producing and songwriting since 2003, the Bama Boyz have accumulated a diverse range of music credits, ranging from genres such as Electro, R&B, Pop, hiphop, Reggaeton, urban gospel, dance, and Latin pop to soundtracks/theme music for films, television shows, commercials, toy lines, and books. They are now known as Watch The Duck.

== History ==
Eddie, Jesse, and Jonathan all grew up in Montgomery, Alabama, in the same neighborhood of Woodley Park. Jesse was a stand out football player at Cloverdale Junior High School and carried his talents to Jefferson Davis High School. Jonathan and Eddie both played in the percussion section of the marching band at Sidney Lanier High School. Even though the trio knew each other from the neighborhood, band, and school, they never created music as a trio until the summer of 2000. By fall 2001, Eddie, Jesse, and Jonathan were all attending Alabama A&M University where they became known for throwing parties on and off campus, creating funny television commercials to advertise their parties, and creating a popular school song and dance.

In 2003, music mogul, Mathew Knowles, pioneer of the Grammy Award-winning, Multi-platinum group Destiny's Child, offered the Bama Boyz a deal immediately after personally witnessing the trio in action in the studio. This opportunity came about when Mathew accepted an invitation to be the keynote speaker and judge for a leadership seminar and talent showcase created and hosted by Eddie, Jesse, and Jonathan at Alabama A&M University. Highly impressed by the trio's professionalism and marketing tactics, Mathew invited the boys to do an internship that summer at his company, Music World Entertainment in Houston, TX.

When the trio arrived in Houston, they learned that the internship was non-paid. Accustomed to the consistent money of their weekly club hustle at Alabama A&M, it didn't take long for the trio's instinct to kick in. In exactly three weeks of living in Houston and studying the nightlife, the Bama Boyz begin supporting their expenses of rent, food, and other necessities by creating, promoting, and operating a successful teen night at a local club. While interning at Mathew's company, the trio jacked Beyoncé's A cappella for her then current single "Crazy in Love" and produced an entirely new beat under her vocals. At that time, Mathew didn't even know that the Bama Boyz produced music. So one day after a label staff meeting, Eddie and Jesse followed Mathew into his office, put their "Crazy in Love Remix" in his stereo and turned the volume up and hit play. Shocked by the boys' boldness but impressed by their remix, Mathew told them that they can begin using the Music World studio anytime they want. After personally observing their work in the studio for a few days, Mathew invited the Bama Boyz to his boat on Clear Lake Shores, Texas, and that's where he offered them a production deal.

== Career ==
The Bama Boyz first major production credits were two remixes for Solange titled "Ain't No Way Bama Boyz Remix" and "Just Like You Bama Boyz Remix". Afterwards, the Bama Boyz created two remixes for Beyonce's "Me, Myself, and I" titled the "Bama Boys Sexy Remix" and the other titled "Bama Boys Throwback Remix", where the trio sampled elements of De La Soul's "Me, Myself, and I". The Bama Boyz first opportunity to work on a movie soundtrack was Roll Bounce, where the guys were credited with additional production credits.

In 2005, the Bama Boyz produced the Destiny's Child song "Home for the Holiday", which became the centerpiece of Wal-Mart's national Christmas campaign. "Home for the Holiday" was also included on the reissue of Destiny's Child's album 8 Days of Christmas. It was the success of this campaign that sparked the Bama Boyz interest in licensing and syncing music.

The Bama Boyz ended up negotiating and producing the music for two more Wal-Mart commercials. Now with an understanding and passion for music synchronization, the Bama Boyz created music for film and television such as Bring It On: All or Nothing, The Pink Panther, Save the Last Dance 2, a Ford Fusion Commercial featuring Funkmaster Flex, MTV's Super Sweet 16 TV Series, Last Holiday, Nickelodeon's "Wow! Wow! Wubbzy" theme song featuring Beyoncé, BET's One Night Only, House of Deréon Commercial, and the UK's Channel 4 hit reality show Chancers, where the Bama Boyz made their first television debut.

Not forgetting their first love of working with artists, the Bama Boyz returned to the studio with a different direction. They produced 8 songs for the platinum selling gospel group Trin-I-Tee 5:7's "T57" album. Their work on T57 earned them a #2 spot on the Gospel Charts, a Grammy Nomination, and a Dove Award for Best Contemporary R&B Gospel Album.

The Bama Boyz also stepped outside the box of music synchronization by producing all the music for "Baby Jamz", a hip-hop/rhythm inspired toy line for preschoolers. The toy line also features a hiphop-inspired nursery rhyme CD, which includes their production. The Bama Boyz also produced the theme song for a series of books called Princess Inc.

The Bama Boyz produced two songs for Solange's Sol-Angel and the Hadley St. Dreams album, including the controversial song "ChampagneChronicNightcap" feat. Lil Wayne and the 1970s throwback "Valentine's Day". They also produced the "Ring the Alarm Bama Boyz Remix" and were responsible for getting Rick Ross and Mike Jones to feature on it.

On Beyonce's third solo LP, which is a double-disc titled I Am... Sasha Fierce, the Bama Boyz produced "Why Don't You Love Me," which features their signature sound of combining both electronic dance music and urban music. "Why Don't You Love Me" shot to the number one position on the Billboard Hot Dance Club Play chart becoming the Bama Boyz's first number-one hit and Knowles' twelfth number-one hit on that chart.

== Discography ==
2Much

- "My Little Cheerleader"

"Baby Jamz Vol.1"

"Baby Jamz Vol.2"

Beyoncé

- "Me, Myself, and I (Bama Boys Throwback Remix)"
- "Me, Myself, and I (Bama Boys Sexxy Remix)"
- "Check On It (Bama Boyz Remix)"
- "Check On It (Reggaeton Remix feat. Julio Voltio)"
- "Check On It (After Dark Remix)"
- "Check On It (Pink Panther Mix)"
- "Check On It (Bama Boyz Creole Mix)"
- "Déjà Vu (Bama Boyz Remix)"
- "Ring the Alarm (Bama Boyz Remix feat. Rick Ross and Mike Jones)"
- "Worldwide Woman (Bama Boyz Remix)"
- "Upgrade You (Bama Boyz Remix)"
- "Greenlight (Bama Boyz Remix)"
- "Naughty Girl (Bama Boyz Remix)"
- "Yes (Bama Boyz Remix)"
- "Hip Hop Star (Bama Boyz Remix)"
- "Baby Boy (Bama Boyz Remix)"
- "Irreplaceable (Bama Boyz Remix)"
- "Why Don't You Love Me"

"Chancers" (Channel 4 Reality Show)

- "Chancer's Theme Music"
- "Mr. Undercover"
- "I Want It All"
- "L.O.V.E"

Destiny's Child

- "Home for the Holiday's"
- "Loose My Breathe (Bama Boyz Remix)"

Ford Fusion TV Commercial

- "Club Scene feat. Funkmaster Flex"

Katy Shotter (UK)

- "Complicated Woman"

Kelly Rowland

- "Like This (Bama Boyz Remix)"

Meet the Bamaz (mixtape)

- "Caught Up in Rock Roll"
- "Meet the Bamaz"
- "Smilin People"
- "Don't Take it Personal"
- "Close Your Legs"
- "Bamaz Discover Relationships (interlude)"
- "Can't Be Yo Everythang"
- "Home"
- "Who Country"
- "Bamaz Reality Check (interlude)"
- "Check Cash"
- "Play in Yo Hair"
- "Beat It Up"
- "Be Cool"
- "Ur The Only One"
- "A Moment"
- "How Long"
- "A Lie"
- "To the Future"

MTV's Super Sweet 16

- "That Motorbike"
- "We Shinin"

Mýa

- "Dial My Number"
- "Manaholic"
- "70's Kinda Love"

Natalia (UK)

- "I Can't Sleep"

Nickelodeon's "Wow! Wow! Wubbzy"

- Theme Song feat Beyoncé

Princess Inc. (Book)

- Theme Song

Roll Bounce (additional production credits)

- "Superman Lover"
- "Bounce, Rock, Skate, Roll"
- "Lovely Day"
- "He's the Greatest Dancer"

Save the Last Dance 2

- "Battle Mix"
- "Symphony"
- "Make It Clap"
- "Rumble"

Socially Awkward E.P.

- "Dim Lights & Illusions (Once the Lights Come On)"
- "Her Inability to Focus"
- "Good-Time Theory"
- "A Tale of A Balling Gentleman"
- "Happi PhuckedUp Day"

Solange Knowles

- "Ain't No Way (Bama Boyz Remix)"
- "Just Like You (Bama Boyz Remix)"
- "Bring It On Home"
- "ChampagneChronicNightcap feat. Lil Wayne"
- "Valentine's Day"
- "Marsai Song" (unreleased)
- "Calendar" (unreleased)

Trin-I-Tee 5:7

- "I Will Lift"
- "Reflection"
- "Love"
- "I Still Love You"
- "God's Triangle"
- "I Want to Go Back"
- "Soul is Anchored (Remake)"
- "U Saved Me (Remake)"
- "O'Holy Night (Remake)"
- "The Christmas Song (Remake)"
- "Give Love on Christmas Day (Remake)"
- "Mary Did You Know (Remake)"
- "White Christmas (Remake)"
- "Joy to the World (Remake)"
- "Lil Drummer Boy (Remake)"
- "Welcome to Our World (Remake)"
- "This Christmas (Remake)"

Wal-Mart National Commercials (TV)

- Back to School Campaign
- Must Have Campaign
