= I Am... Sasha Fierce =

2008 studio album by Beyoncé

- Standard edition artwork

Studio album by Beyoncé
- Released: November 12, 2008
- Recorded: November 2007–August 2008
- Studios: Chung King; Electric Lady; Germano Studios The Hit Factory; Roc the Mic; Strawberrybee Productions (New York City); Bangladesh; PatchWerk; Silent Sound; Soapbox; Tree Sound (Atlanta); 2nd Floor (Orlando); South Beat (Miami Beach); Music World (Houston); Mansfield; The Campground (Los Angeles); The Boom Boom Room (Burbank); GAD (Ibiza)
- Genres: Pop; R&B
- Length: 41:36
- Labels: Music World; Columbia
- Producers: Bama Boyz; Bangladesh; D-Town; Darkchild; Ian Dench; Blac Elvis; Toby Gad; Sean Garrett; Amanda Ghost; Andrew Hey; Jim Jonsin; Beyoncé; Harold Lilly; Dave McCracken; Rico Love; Ramon "REO" Owen; Stargate; Tricky Stewart; Ryan Tedder; The-Dream; Wayne Wilkins

Beyoncé chronology
The Beyoncé Experience Live (2007)	I Am... Sasha Fierce (2008)	Above and Beyoncé: Video Collection & Dance Mixes (2009)

Singles from I Am... Sasha Fierce
- 1. "If I Were a Boy" / "Single Ladies (Put a Ring on It)" Released: October 8, 2008; 2. "Diva" / "Halo" Released: January 20, 2009; 3. "Ego" Released: May 19, 2009; 4. "Sweet Dreams" Released: June 2, 2009; 5. "Broken-Hearted Girl" Released: August 28, 2009; 6. "Video Phone" Released: September 22, 2009; 7. "Why Don't You Love Me" Released: June 11, 2010

I Am... Sasha Fierce is the third studio album by American singer Beyoncé. It was released on November 12, 2008, by Columbia Records and Music World Entertainment. The album was recorded from November 2007 to August 2008, with production handled by Darkchild, Toby Gad, Jim Jonsin, Rico Love, Stargate, Tricky Stewart, Ryan Tedder of OneRepublic, and The-Dream, among others. Although there are no featured artists on the album's main track listing, fellow American singers Lady Gaga and Kanye West appear on deluxe editions of the album.

Upon its original release, I Am... Sasha Fierce was structured as a double album and intended to present Beyoncé's dichotomous artistic persona. The first disc I Am... contains slow and midtempo pop and R&B ballads, while the second, Sasha Fierce—titled after Beyoncé's onstage alter ego—focuses on more up-tempo beats that blend electropop and Europop elements. When writing the songs' lyrics, Beyoncé worked with writers in sessions accompanied by live orchestration. She credited both her husband, rapper Jay-Z, and jazz singer Etta James for inspiring her to push the limits of her songwriting and artistry. Musically, I Am... drew inspiration from folk and alternative rock, blended acoustic guitar elements into contemporary ballads, and was written and produced by Beyoncé in collaboration with Babyface, Tricky Stewart, The-Dream and Ryan Tedder. Meanwhile, Sasha Fierce featured production from Darkchild and Sean Garrett.

I Am... Sasha Fierce received mixed-to-positive reviews from music critics and was a commercial success, debuting at number one on the U.S. Billboard 200 chart after selling 482,000 units and earning Beyoncé her third consecutive U.S. number-one solo album. The album has earned one diamond certification and more than 30 platinum certifications in separate worldwide markets, and has been certified seven-times platinum by the Recording Industry Association of America (RIAA) for more than seven million units in the United States. I Am... Sasha Fierce has sold 10 million copies worldwide, making it one of the best-selling albums of the 21st century. The album garnered seven Grammy Award nominations at the 52nd Annual Grammy Awards ceremony (2010), including a nomination for Album of the Year, and won five. With a sixth win during the ceremony, Beyoncé broke the record for most awards won in one night by a female artist.

The album was marketed with the release of several singles, including "If I Were a Boy" and "Single Ladies (Put a Ring on It)", both of which charted highly worldwide. The former topped charts in nine countries and reached number three on the Billboard Hot 100, with the latter becoming her fifth number-one single on the Hot 100 chart. "Diva" and "Ego" were released exclusively in the United States, while "Halo" and "Sweet Dreams" were promoted internationally as the third and fourth singles, respectively. "Broken-Hearted Girl" was released internationally as the fifth single, while "Video Phone" was released in September 2009 as the overall eighth, and "Why Don't You Love Me" was released in July 2010 as the ninth and final single. To further promote the album, Beyoncé made several award-show and television appearances across Europe and North America, and embarked on the worldwide I Am... Tour (2009–10).

== Recording and production ==
The album was recorded over a nine-month period. Beyoncé recorded the album at Bangladesh Studios, PatchWerk Recording Studios, Silent Sound Studios and Tree Sound Studios in Atlanta, Georgia; Chung King Studios, Electric Lady Studios, Roc the Mic Studios and Strawberrybee Productions in New York City, New York; GAD Studios in Ibiza, Spain; Mansfield Studios and The Campground in Los Angeles, California; South Beat Studios in Miami Beach, Florida; and The Boom Boom Room in Burbank, California. Beyoncé co-wrote or co-produced all of the material on I Am... Sasha Fierce. She collaborated with several record producers and songwriters, including Babyface, Stargate (production duo composed of Tor Erik Hermansen and Mikkel Storleer Eriksen), Tricky Stewart, The-Dream, Darkchild, Sean Garrett, Solange Knowles, Jim Jonsin, Rico Love, Ryan Tedder, Bangladesh, Ian Dench, Dave McCracken, Wayne Wilkins and Blac Elvis. Beyoncé also collaborated with musicians she had not worked with previously, such as Toby Gad and BC Jean on "If I Were a Boy"; she also worked again with Amanda Ghost on "Disappear".

I'm a human being. I cry. I'm very passionate and sensitive. My feelings get hurt. I get scared and nervous like everyone else. And I wanted to show that about myself. It [The album] is about love. I'm a woman, I'm married, and this portion of my life is all in the album. It's a lot more personal. I'm very private and I don't talk about a lot of things, but there are certain songs that are on the album that are very personal. It's [The album] my diary. It's my story... I still have my album of fun songs.

— Beyoncé

For the I Am... disc, Beyoncé was influenced by folk and alternative rock genres and incorporated instruments she had not typically used before, such as the acoustic guitar. Tedder specifically helped Beyoncé craft the album's balladry. The ballads were crafted to combine "the best elements" of pop and soul music, while also "expanding the possibilities of both genres". Beyoncé took a different approach because of the strong expectations surrounding her work; she experimented with more direct lyrics. Beyoncé worked with Ghost to rewrite Franz Schubert's "Ave Maria" after co-writing "Disappear" in London, England. Ghost told The Daily Telegraph that they were both inspired by their recent marriages and had walked down the aisle to "Ave Maria". The song "Smash Into You", featured on the deluxe edition of the album, was originally slated to appear on Jon McLaughlin's second album OK Now under the name "Smack Into You", but was cut from the final track listing after it leaked online and was then given to Beyoncé.

During the nine-month period between November 2007 and August 2008, Beyoncé recorded over seventy songs and decided during the editing process that she did not want to merge the two approaches onto one disc. If a song lacked personal meaning for her, she cut it during the selection process for the final track listing. After the selection process, twelve tracks were selected to be placed on the standard edition of the album, while five additional tracks were chosen for the deluxe edition. Beyoncé later revealed that songs from established producers like The Neptunes and Danja were unable to make the final cut.

== Music and lyrics ==
In an interview for Billboard magazine, Beyoncé described I Am... Sasha Fierce as a double album. She said, "One side has songs that are more mainstream and another has my more traditional R&B songs for my fans who've been there the whole time. Some of it sounds like Barbra Streisand, Karen Carpenter and The Beatles around the 1970s." Music writer Andy Kellman of AllMusic described its first disc as "essentially a small set of adult contemporary ballads. Acoustic guitars, pianos, strings, contemplative soul searching, and grand sweeping gestures fill it out, with more roots in '[19]70s soft rock than soul." The second disc, Sasha Fierce, contains recurring electronic influences, which appear in songs such as "Radio" and "Sweet Dreams". Kellman said in his review that "Diva" resembles B'Day's "Freakum Dress" or "Ring the Alarm" in terms of audacity. Although they appear on the Sasha Fierce disc, "Ego", "Why Don't You Love Me" and "Scared of Lonely" were described as a meeting ground between the album's halves. According to Jennifer Vineyard of MTV News, they resemble Sasha Fierce musically, but thematically and lyrically, they are vulnerable like Beyoncé on the I Am... disc. The album formally introduces Beyoncé's alter ego Sasha Fierce. She revealed that Sasha was born during the making of her hit single "Crazy in Love" (2003). In an interview with Emmet Sullivan of People magazine, Beyoncé affirmed that her alter ego is strictly for the stage, with the editor describing Sasha Fierce as the singer's sensual, aggressive alter ego.

"If I Were a Boy", the first single of I Am..., is the only song on either disc that Beyoncé did not co-write. BC Jean, who wrote most of the song's lyrics, drew inspiration from a troubled relationship. Beyoncé explained in Essence that "If I Were a Boy" is different from her previous songs because it is not a traditional R&B song. Music critics remarked that the song seemed to be a mix of her hit single "Irreplaceable" (2006), Fergie's single "Big Girls Don't Cry" (2007), and Ciara's single "Like a Boy" (2007). Ann Powers of the Los Angeles Times viewed the song's theme of female empowerment as an expansion on that of "Irreplaceable". Musically, "Single Ladies" is an upbeat-dance-pop and R&B song, and features dancehall and bounce influences. According to Jonah Weiner of Blender, the song clearly references marriage while Greg Kot of the Chicago Tribune felt that the lyrics were connected to "post-breakup". "Halo", composed by Ryan Tedder and Evan Bogart, was initially intended for Beyoncé but was nearly recorded by Leona Lewis because of Beyoncé's schedule. According to Christian Williams of Billboard, "Halo" has a mainstream pop sound with subtle R&B undertones.

"Ave Maria" samples Franz Schubert's "Ave Maria". Critics noted "Diva" as a variation on Lil Wayne's "A Milli" and coined it as its female counterpart. "Diva" carries a stuttering beat. "Sweet Dreams" was praised by critics for its use of electronic bassline, which some critics compared to Michael Jackson's "Beat It" because of its electropop sound. "Sweet Dreams" is rooted in contemporary R&B and incorporates influences from the classic 1980s funk. "Broken-Hearted Girl" is a midtempo piano ballad. Its production and melody are backed by strings and a drum machine beat. According to Spence D. of IGN Music, "Hello" comes across as another ballad that "populate[s] the first part of the album." It contains the Jerry Maguire line – "You had me at hello" – as part of its chorus. It consists mainly of "sweet guitar-picking and delicate harmonies." According to critics, "Video Phone" contains lyrics referring to "a celebration of Skype sex and putting on a solo show, on camera, for a guy you just met at the club". The remixed version features both Beyoncé and Lady Gaga trading verses with one another. Musically, the song consists of simple lyrics, with subtle innuendos, and is backed by sparse beats, with Beyoncé and Gaga uttering gasps and groans while singing. "Disappear" consists of "sweet guitar-picking and delicate harmonies". "That's Why You're Beautiful" is a slow-tempo soft rock and rock power ballad, which features a "grungy" guitar riff and stuttering drums. Critics compared the song with material by Alice in Chains and Jill Scott. The platinum edition of the album also included a cover version of Billy Joel's song "Honesty" (1979).

== Title and artwork ==
The rear cover art for I Am... Sasha Fierce, which acts as the primary artwork for the Sasha Fierce disc.

The album was titled I Am... Sasha Fierce to showcase the difference between Beyoncé and her alter ego Sasha Fierce; the first disc is titled I Am... while the second is titled Sasha Fierce.

Comparing the project to a magazine, Beyoncé said that I Am... Sasha Fierce was a double album with two covers. The I Am... cover artwork, described as "underneath all the makeup", is a portrait of Beyoncé with no visible clothing or makeup on, while the Sasha Fierce cover artwork shows Beyoncé wearing heavy makeup, a leotard, tall pointed heels, and a "cyborg"-esque metallic glove. The cover artwork for the standard, deluxe, and platinum editions of I Am... Sasha Fierce were all shot by German photographer Peter Lindbergh.

In a 2021 interview for Harper's Bazaar, Beyoncé revealed that she based the entire project on black-and-white photography after being told during an analytics meeting that research showed her fans did not like her black-and-white photography, stating, "It pissed me off that an agency could dictate what my fans wanted based on a survey." She pointed out that she was "so exhausted and annoyed with these formulaic corporate companies" and highlighted the album's subsequent commercial success.

== Release and promotion ==
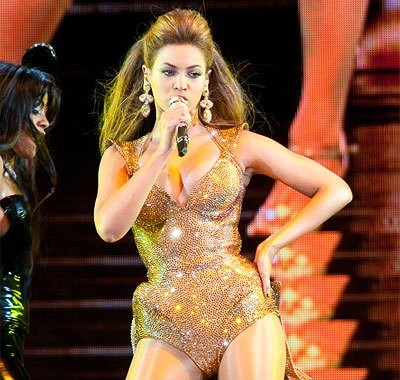
Beyoncé performing in Vienna, Austria during the I Am... Tour on April 28, 2009

Beyoncé promoted I Am... Sasha Fierce through various televised appearances and awards ceremonies, performing songs from the album from late 2008 to early 2010. Beyoncé's father and then-manager Mathew Knowles held a listening party for the album in New York City on October 22, 2008. She first promoted "Single Ladies (Put a Ring on It)" at a concert organized by the Power 105.1 radio station on October 29. She first performed "If I Were a Boy" on October 31, on the Japanese music television program Music Station. She later performed "If I Were a Boy" on November 6, at the 2008 MTV Europe Music Awards. Soon after, on November 9, she sang "If I Were a Boy" and "Single Ladies (Put a Ring on It)" at the 2008 World Music Awards in Monaco. She then performed on The Oprah Winfrey Show to perform "If I Were a Boy" on November 13. She appeared on Saturday Night Live on November 15, where she sang "Single Ladies (Put a Ring on It)". On November 16, Beyoncé sang a medley of "If I Were a Boy", "Single Ladies (Put a Ring on It)", and "Crazy in Love" during the final episode of Total Request Live.

I Am... Sasha Fierce was released in the United States on November 18, 2008, after earlier releases in Japan on November 12, in Australia and Germany on November 14, and in France and the United Kingdom on November 17. The deluxe edition was released simultaneously with the standard edition. Beyoncé performed "Single Ladies (Put a Ring on It)" on BET's 106 & Park on November 18, at the 2008 American Music Awards on November 23, on The Ellen DeGeneres Show on November 25, on Today the following day, and on The Tyra Banks Show with two male dancers, on January 9, 2009. Beyoncé's first live performance of "Halo" was at the 40th NAACP Image Awards on February 12, 2009. She later performed the song on the Late Show with David Letterman after an interview on April 22, 2009. Beyoncé performed "Sweet Dreams" at the 2009 MTV Europe Music Awards on November 5. Beyoncé performed "If I Were a Boy" on January 31, 2010, at the 52nd Annual Grammy Awards ceremony, along with a cover of Alanis Morissette's song "You Oughta Know" (1995). In February 2010, the bonus track "Why Don't You Love Me", from the album's multiple reissues, climbed the U.S. Dance Club Songs, eventually reaching the top spot and becoming Beyoncé's thirteenth number-one hit on the chart. On May 4, 2010, a full-length music video appeared online after the song was released as a promotional single.

On June 16, 2009, Above and Beyoncé: Video Collection & Dance Mixes was released, consisting of a CD of dance remixes of the album's singles, including the remix of "Ego" with rapper Kanye West, and a DVD featuring previously released music videos for the singles, as well as behind-the-scenes footage. Beyoncé was scheduled to perform "Sweet Dreams" at the 2009 MTV Video Music Awards on September 13; however, she performed only the song's bridge at the beginning of her set, before switching to "Single Ladies (Put a Ring on It)". The platinum edition of I Am... Sasha Fierce was released in Australia on Beyoncé's twenty-eighth birthday on September 4, 2009, and in the United States on October 20, 2009; it included a cover version of Billy Joel's song "Honesty" (1979), as well as a DVD containing various music videos from the album's singles. The deluxe edition of I Am... Sasha Fierce was reissued in the United States on November 23, 2009, including all previously released songs as well as the new songs "Poison" and the remix of "Video Phone" with Lady Gaga. An extended play (EP) titled I Am... Sasha Fierce – The Bonus Tracks was released the same day for digital download in the United States, featuring the latter songs, along with "Why Don't You Love Me".

To further promote the album, Beyoncé embarked on the I Am... Tour, which began in Edmonton, Canada on March 26, 2009. The European leg of the tour started on April 26 in Zagreb, Croatia, and ended on June 9 in London, England. On June 21, she began the third leg of the tour in the United States and ended in August with the I Am... Yours four-day revue at Encore Las Vegas on the Las Vegas Strip. Beginning on September 15, 2009, the fourth leg began in Melbourne, Australia and ended on September 24 in Perth, Australia. Beyoncé then went on to perform in Asia, the Middle East, Europe, Africa, and the United Kingdom, before finishing the 2009 portion of the tour on November 24 in Belfast, Northern Ireland. The tour held its final leg in Latin America in February 2010. Beginning on February 4 in Florianópolis, Brazil, she visited five other locations before ending the tour in Trinidad on February 18. According to Pollstar, the 2010 shows earned $17.2 million, which added to the total of $86 million for the first 86 concerts in 2009, bringing the tour's total to $103.2 million for 97 shows. The I Am... Yours residency at the Encore Theater in Las Vegas was recorded on August 2, 2009, and later released as a DVD, audio CD, and television special in late November 2009 titled I Am... Yours: An Intimate Performance at Wynn Las Vegas. Various performances on the tour were filmed worldwide for a live DVD, I Am... World Tour, which was released on November 30, 2010.

== Singles ==
On October 8, 2008, Beyoncé premiered two lead singles from the album. "If I Were a Boy" peaked at number three on the U.S. Billboard Hot 100, topped eight charts worldwide and reached the top ten on many other charts. "Single Ladies (Put a Ring on It)" was the second lead single, and peaked at number one on the U.S. Billboard Hot 100, becoming Beyoncé's fifth number-one single, and was also successful internationally, peaking within the top ten around the world. The singles were certified double platinum and quadruple platinum, respectively, by the Recording Industry Association of America (RIAA). "Diva" was released exclusively in the United States and peaked at number nineteen on the U.S. Billboard Hot 100, becoming Beyoncé's twelfth top-20 single, and at number three on the U.S. Hot R&B/Hip-Hop Songs. It was certified gold by the RIAA. The next single, "Halo", was released internationally and peaked at number five on the U.S. Billboard Hot 100, proving to be commercially successful and reaching the top ten around the world. It was certified double platinum by the RIAA on January 5, 2010.

After the I Am... Tour was announced, two more singles were initially planned: "Broken-Hearted Girl" and "Sweet Dreams"—though their release order was switched, making them the sixth and seventh singles, respectively. "Sweet Dreams" reached the top ten in many countries, including the United States, and topped the New Zealand Singles Chart, and was certified platinum by the RIAA on January 5, 2010. "Broken-Hearted Girl", the seventh single, reached the top forty on charts around the world, despite never being certified or released in the United States. "Video Phone" was released as the eighth single from I Am... Sasha Fierce on September 22, 2009, with an accompanying music video and digital download release, taking form as an extended remix featuring American recording artist Lady Gaga. Like its predecessor, it reached the top-forty on charts around the world, peaking at number sixty-five on the U.S. Billboard Hot 100. It also became Beyoncé's fourteenth number-one on the U.S. Hot Dance Club Songs. "Why Don't You Love Me" was released as the ninth and final single on July 2, 2010, and peaked atop the U.S. Hot Dance Club Songs, before its official single release. As of July 2010, the digital tracks from the album had sold a combined total of 12.3 million units in the United States; and according to Columbia Records the album has sold fifteen million digital singles worldwide.

== Critical reception ==
Professional ratings
Aggregate scores
Source	Rating
AnyDecentMusic?	4.9/10
Metacritic	62/100
Review scores
Source	Rating
AllMusic	3.5/5 stars
Blender	3/5 stars
Entertainment Weekly	B+
The Guardian	3/5 stars
MSN Music (Consumer Guide)	B
The Observer	2/5 stars
Pitchfork	5.7/10
Rolling Stone	3.5/5 stars
Spin	4/10
USA Today	3/4 stars

I Am... Sasha Fierce received mixed reviews from critics. At Metacritic, which assigns a normalized rating out of 100 to reviews from mainstream publications, the album received an average score of 62 (indicating "generally favorable reviews"), based on 24 reviews. Slant Magazine's Sal Cinquemani wrote that the album's "strength" is "its individual songs ... a testament to Beyoncé as one of today's most reliable singles artists", but felt that "the real disparity is her inability to reconcile the adult-contemporary schmaltz of I Am with the more modern, edgy sounds of Sasha Fierce." Adam Mattera of The Observer felt that both discs lack depth, observing that the first is "too busy chasing radio formats to expose any genuine soul", and criticizing the second disc's "succession of independent woman anthems such as 'Single Ladies' and 'Diva', which will no doubt inspire drag queens the world over but leave most others bemused."

AllMusic's Andy Kellman called its double-disc "gimmick" "flimsy" and favored its second disc's "decent, if easily forgettable, upbeat pop." He expressed that on the I Am... disc, "Beyoncé feels each line to the fullest extent, which almost rescues the set's staidness." In his consumer guide for MSN Music, Robert Christgau named it the "dud of the month", indicating "a bad record whose details rarely merit further thought". He found its "split-personality bit" to be "deeply vapid", only observing "three good songs on this 11-track artifact". Jonah Weiner of Blender commented that "Beyoncé is still a beauty-shop feminist, quick with the smack-downs, and she still describes the rattling rush of love with preternatural poise". Stacey Anderson of Spin commented that its first disc "meanders over [...] down-tempo cuts" and called ... Sasha "an intriguing but diluted direction".

The Village Voice's Nana Ekua Brew-Hammond felt that the I Am... disc lacks cohesion, but complimented "Sasha Fierce as "brassy, big-headed, confrontational, and witty," and stated, "each incendiary track challenges you to leave your inhibitions at coat-check." Christian Hoard of Rolling Stone noted that its slow songs are "full of bland self-affirmation and saggy lines", but wrote that "the Sasha disc boasts Beyoncé's most adventurous music yet". Colin McGuire of PopMatters called the album "a little rough around the edges at times" and viewed its Sasha Fierce disc as "a far more compelling trip down dance-lane". Leah Greenblatt of Entertainment Weekly wrote that the album offers "two compelling sides" of Beyoncé and stated: "The collection might have been better served had she edited it down to one disc, rather than belabor what ultimately seems like a marketing gimmick. And while fans will surely speculate, there's little in the lyrics that feels more revealing than previous emotional fire-starters." Sasha Frere-Jones from The New Yorker found the album to be "something of a mess", mostly because the alter ego "trips on the idea of redefinition".

== Accolades ==
Leah Greenblatt of Entertainment Weekly ranked I Am… Sasha Fierce at number two on her list "10 Best CDs of 2008", stating that "'If I Were a Boy' and 'Single Ladies (Put a Ring on It)' are undoubtedly album highlights; still, the surprise here is how consistently satisfying the rest of it is – even the less showy tracks blossom on repeated listening." Mark Edward Nero of About.com ranked it ninth on his list of the Best R&B Albums of 2008. Christian Gerard of NBC Washington placed I Am... Sasha Fierce on his list of "Honorable Mentions" while writing the list "Best Albums of 2008". Agence France-Presse, as reported by ABS-CBN News and Current Affairs, recognized I Am... Sasha Fierce as the twelfth best-selling album of 2008. On The Village Voice's Pazz & Jop year-end lists, I Am... Sasha Fierce was ranked at numbers three-hundred-and-thirty-three and five-hundred-and-eighty in 2008 and 2009, respectively. The album was ranked at number twelve on the list of the best albums of the 2000s decade in Rolling Stone's Reader's Poll. The writers of Entertainment Weekly ranked I Am... Sasha Fierce at number eight on their list "10 Best Albums of the Decade".

I Am... Sasha Fierce won a Soul Train Music Award for Best Album of the Year at the 2009 Soul Train Music Awards. Beyoncé won the American Music Award for Favorite Soul/R&B Female Artist at the American Music Awards of 2009, while I Am... Sasha Fierce garnered a nomination for Favorite Soul/R&B Album. Beyoncé also won a BET Award for Best R&B Artist at the BET Awards 2009. However, she lost the same award to Alicia Keys at the following ceremony. Similarly, Beyoncé was nominated for Brit Award for International Female Solo Artist at the 2009 Brit Awards, for a Meteor Music Award for Best International Female at the 2009 Meteor Awards, and for International Dance Music Awards for Best Artist (Solo) and Best R&B/Urban Dance Track for "Sweet Dreams" at the 25th Annual International Dance Music Awards (2010). At the MOBO Awards 2009, Beyoncé won the MOBO Award for Best International Act and I Am... Sasha Fierce was nominated for Best Album. Beyoncé won an MTV Europe Music Award for Best Female, "Single Ladies (Put a Ring on It)" won Best Video and "Halo" won Best Song at the 2009 MTV Europe Music Awards.

I Am... Sasha Fierce was nominated for the NAACP Image Award for Outstanding Album at the 40th NAACP Image Awards (2009), and for an NRJ Music Award for International Album of the Year at the NRJ Music Awards 2010. Beyoncé was also nominated for a People's Choice Award for Favorite Female Artist and Favorite R&B Artist at the 36th People's Choice Awards (2010), as well as winning a Teen Choice Award for Choice Music: R&B Artist at the 2010 Teen Choice Awards, and being nominated for World's Best R&B Artist at the 2010 World Music Awards. I Am... Sasha Fierce and its singles earned Beyoncé seven Grammy Award nominations at the 52nd Annual Grammy Awards (2010), including Album of the Year. She won five Grammy Awards out of those seven nominations, as well as a record-breaking sixth for her rendition of the classic Etta James song "At Last", from the Cadillac Records soundtrack. Her wins made her the most decorated female artist in one night in Grammy Award history.

== Commercial performance ==
I Am... Sasha Fierce debuted at number one on the U.S. Billboard 200, selling 482,000 copies in its first week and giving Beyoncé her third consecutive number-one album in the United States, fourth overall, including Destiny's Child's Survivor (2001). With the debut, Beyoncé became the third female artist of the 2000s to have her first three solo albums debut atop the U.S. Billboard 200. Having sold 1,459,000 copies in six weeks of release by the end of 2008, I Am... Sasha Fierce emerged as the tenth best-selling album of the year according to Billboard. With this achievement, Beyoncé eventually equaled Garth Brooks, Mariah Carey, and Shania Twain for placing an album in Nielsen SoundScan's year-end top ten for the fifth time. The album later emerged as the second best-selling album of 2009 in the United States. It has been certified six-times platinum by the Recording Industry Association of America (RIAA). As of July 2022, I Am... Sasha Fierce has sold 8.12 million album-equivalent units in the United States. In the United Kingdom, the album debuted at number ten on November 29, 2008, becoming Beyoncé's lowest-debuting album despite having higher first-week sales than her previous album, B'Day (2006). Following her performance at The X Factor fifth season finale with winner Alexandra Burke, the album moved up to number nine on December 27, 2008. Due to the success of its singles in the United Kingdom, particularly "Sweet Dreams", I Am... Sasha Fierce rose from number five to its highest peak of number two in its thirty-ninth week on the chart, which was the week of August 16, 2009. It is her best-selling album in the United Kingdom, having sold over 1.5 million units. It was certified six times platinum by the British Phonographic Industry.

In Australia, I Am... Sasha Fierce debuted at number nine on November 24, 2008 and climbed to number eight on January 5, 2009. Following the success of singles "Sweet Dreams" and "Broken-Hearted Girl", the album rebounded to a new peak of number three on two separate occasions in October 2009. It was later certified quintuple platinum by the Australian Recording Industry Association (ARIA) in 2023. In New Zealand, the album debuted at number sixteen on November 24, 2008 and initially peaked at number six on March 2, 2009. As its singles grew in popularity, especially "Sweet Dreams", the album rose to a new peak of number three on September 21, 2009. The album was certified platinum by the Recording Industry Association of New Zealand (RIANZ) on April 26, 2009 (after twenty-three weeks on the chart), shipping over 15,000 copies to retailers. In Spain, the album debuted and peaked at number seven on November 26, 2008, and was certified double platinum by the Productores de Música de España (PROMUSICAE) for shipments of over 160,000 copies. The album was also the best-selling international album of 2009 in Turkey. The album experienced massive success in Brazil, topping the country's year-end chart and being certified double diamond for sales of more than 500,000 copies by Pro-Música Brasil. The album has sold more than ten million copies worldwide.

== Track listing ==
=== I Am... (disc one) ===
Standard edition
No.	Title	Lyrics	Music	Producer(s)	Length
1.	"If I Were a Boy"	Toby Gad; Brittany Carlson	Gad; Carlson	Gad; Beyoncé	4:09
2.	"Halo"	Ryan Tedder; Evan Bogart; Beyoncé Knowles	Tedder; Bogart; Knowles	Tedder; Beyoncé	4:21
3.	"Disappear"	Amanda Gosein; Hugo Chakrabongse; Dave McCracken; Ian Dench	Gosein; McCracken; Dench; Knowles	Amanda Ghost; McCracken; Dench; Beyoncé	4:27
4.	"Broken-Hearted Girl"	Kenneth Edmonds; Knowles	Mikkel S. Eriksen; Tor Erik Hermansen; Edmonds; Knowles	Stargate; Beyoncé	4:37
5.	"Ave Maria"	Knowles; Ghost; Dench; Makeba Riddick	Eriksen; Hermansen; Knowles; Ghost; Dench	Stargate; Beyoncé	3:42
6.	"Satellites"	Ghost; Knowles; McCracken; Dench	Ghost; McCracken; Dench; Knowles	Ghost; McCracken; Dench; Beyoncé	3:06
Total length:					24:22

Deluxe edition
No.	Title	Lyrics	Music	Producer(s)	Length
6.	"Smash Into You"	Christopher Stewart; Terius Nash	Stewart; Nash; Knowles	Tricky Stewart; The-Dream; Beyoncé	4:31
7.	"Satellites"	Gosein; McCracken; Dench	Gosein; McCracken; Dench; Knowles	Ghost; McCracken; Dench; Beyoncé	3:06
8.	"That's Why You're Beautiful"	James Fauntleroy	Andrew Hey; Knowles	Hey; Beyoncé	3:41
Total length:					32:24

Japanese, iTunes Store and international digital bonus track
No.	Title	Lyrics	Music	Producer(s)	Length
9.	"Save the Hero"	Knowles; James Scheffer; Richard Butler Jr.; Alexandra Tamposi	Scheffer; Butler Jr.; Knowles	Jim Jonsin; Rico Love; Beyoncé	4:33
Total length:					36:57

=== Sasha Fierce (disc two) ===
Standard edition
No.	Title	Lyrics	Music	Producer(s)	Length
1.	"Single Ladies (Put a Ring on It)"	Stewart; Knowles; Nash; Thaddis Harrell	Stewart; Nash; Knowles	Stewart; The-Dream; Beyoncé	3:13
2.	"Radio"	Scheffer; Butler; Dwayne Nesmith	Scheffer; Butler; Nesmith; Knowles	Jim Jonsin; D-Town; Rico Love; Beyoncé	3:38
3.	"Diva"	Knowles; Shondrae Crawford; Sean Garrett	Crawford; Garrett; Knowles	Bangladesh; Sean Garrett; Beyoncé	3:20
4.	"Sweet Dreams"	Butler; Knowles; Scheffer; Wayne Wilkins	Scheffer; Wilkins; Butler; Knowles	Jim Jonsin; Wayne Wilkins; Rico Love; Beyoncé	3:28
5.	"Video Phone"	Knowles; Crawford; Garrett; Angela Beyincé	Crawford; Garrett; Knowles	Bangladesh; Sean Garrett; Beyoncé	3:35
Total length:					17:14

Deluxe edition
No.	Title	Lyrics	Music	Producer(s)	Length
6.	"Hello"	Knowles; David Quiñones; Bogart	Knowles; Ramon Owen	REO; Beyoncé	4:16
7.	"Ego"	Elvis Williams; Harold Lilly	Williams; Lilly; Knowles	Blac Elvis; Lilly; Beyoncé	3:56
8.	"Scared of Lonely"	Rodney Jerkins; LaShawn Daniels; Crystal Johnson; Butler; B. Knowles; Solange Knowles	Jerkins; B. Knowles	Darkchild; Beyoncé	3:42
Total length:					29:08

Japanese, iTunes Store and international digital bonus track
No.	Title	Lyrics	Music	Producer(s)	Length
9.	"Why Don't You Love Me"	S. Knowles; B. Knowles; Beyincé	Eddie Smith III; Jesse Rankins; Jonathan Wells; B. Knowles	Bama Boyz; Beyoncé	3:37
Total length:					32:45

=== Notes ===
- Track listing variants of I Am...
  - iTunes Store and international digital standard editions include "Save the Hero".
  - iTunes Store deluxe edition includes the music video for "If I Were a Boy".
  - Latin American standard edition includes "Si Yo Fuera un Chico", the Spanish version of "If I Were a Boy".
  - Japanese platinum edition includes all nine tracks listed above, plus the Maurice Joshua Mojo UK Remix of "If I Were a Boy", Dave Audé Club Remix of "Halo", and Catalyst Remix of "Broken-Hearted Girl".
- Track listing variants of Sasha Fierce
  - United States Walmart standard edition includes "Why Don't You Love Me".
  - iTunes Store deluxe edition includes the music video for "Single Ladies (Put a Ring on It)".
  - Japanese platinum edition includes all nine tracks listed above, plus the DJ Escape & Tony Coluccio Remix of "Single Ladies (Put a Ring on It)", Karmatronic Club Remix of "Diva", OK DAC Remix of "Ego", Harlan Pepper & AG III Remix of "Sweet Dreams", and a remix of "Ego" featuring Kanye West.
- Track listing variants of single-disc releases
  - Platinum edition compiles all the tracks from both discs into a single disc in a different track order and includes the remix of "Ego" featuring Kanye West and a cover version of "Honesty", plus a DVD which features eight music videos and behind the scenes material.
  - International digital platinum edition includes additionally the Slang "Big Ego" Club Mix of "Ego" and Karmatronic Club Mix of "Diva".
  - International iTunes Store platinum edition includes additionally the Steve Pitron and Max Sanna Club Remix of "Sweet Dreams".
  - 2009 reissue deluxe edition compiles the tracks from both deluxe edition discs into a single disc with the same track order and includes the bonus track "Poison" and the extended remix of "Video Phone" featuring Lady Gaga.

== Personnel ==
Credits adapted from the liner notes of I Am... Sasha Fierce.

- Beyoncé – lead vocals, background vocals (track 2.08); A&R, executive producer, arrangement, audio production (tracks 1.01–06, 1.07–08, 2.01–08); vocal production (tracks 1.06, 2.01)
- Mathew Knowles – A&R, executive producer
- Max Gousse – A&R
- Juli Knapp – A&R administration
- Alexandra Velella – A&R coordination
- Jake McKim – artist coordination
- Beyoncé – executive producer
- Quincy S. Jackson – marketing
- Tim Blacksmith – management
- Danny D – management
- Rico Love – background vocals (2.04), audio production, vocal production (2.02, 2.04)
- Jim Caruana – background vocals (1.04); recording engineer (tracks 1.03, 1.08, 2.04, instrumental: 1.06, 2.02), mixing (track 1.08); Jim Caruana (tracks 1.01–02, 1.06–07, 2.01–03, 2.05–08, Additional - 1.04)
- Fusako Chubachi – art direction
- Jean-Paul Gaultier – clothing design
- Thierry Mugler – clothing design
- Kimberly Kimble – hair stylist
- ilovedust – logo design
- Francesca Tolot – make-up
- Manicurist – Lisa Logan – manicurist
- Peter Lindbergh – photography
- Ty Hunter – stylist
- Jens Gad – drums (live-track 1.01)
- Steven J. – drums (1.07)
- Syience – drums, guitar (1.01)
- Ian Dench – guitar (track 1.05); audio production (1.03, 1.07)
- Philip Margiziotis – additional horns (track 2.07)
- Donald Hayes – saxophone (track 2.07)
- Dontae Winslow – trumpet (track 2.07)
- Stargate – other instrumentation, recording engineer, production (1.04–05)
- Toby Gad – instrumentation (1.01); arrangement (track 1.01); recording engineer (instrumental: 1.01); production
- Andrew Hey – instrumentation, recording engineer (1.08); production
- Darkchild – instrumentation, production, mixing (2.08)
- Ryan Tedder – arrangement, engineer, instrumentation and audio production (1.02)
- Tricky Stewart – audio production (1.06, 2.01)
- Dave McCracken – audio production (1.03, 1.07)
- Amanda Ghost – audio production (1.03, 1.07)
- Wayne Wilkins – audio production, mixing (2.04)
- Bangladesh – audio production (2.03, 2.05)
- Sean Garrett – audio production (2.03, 2.05)
- The-Dream – audio production (1.06, 2.01)
- D-Town – audio production
- BC Jean – audio production
- Kuk Harrell – recording engineer (1.06, 2.01)
- Jim Jonsin – recording engineer (instrumental: 2.02); mixing, production (2.04)
- Miles Walker – recording engineer (instrumental: 2.03, 2.05)
- Brian "B Luv" Thomas – recording engineer (instrumental: 1.06, 2.01)
- Marcos Tovar – recording engineer (1.03, instrumental: 1.07)
- David Quiñones – recording engineer (instrumental: 2.06)
- Mack Woodard – recording engineer (instrumental: 2.07)
- Mike "Handz" Donaldson – recording engineer (instrumental: 2.08)
- Roberto "Tito" Vasquez – recording engineer (instrumental: 2.08)
- Radio Killa – recording engineer
- Kory Aaron – assistant engineer (tracks 2.03, 2.05)
- Christian Baker – assistant engineer (1.02)
- David Boyd – assistant engineer (1.08)
- Michael Miller – assistant engineer (2.03, 2.05)
- Johntá Austin – assistant engineer
- Lady Gaga – assistant engineer
- Tom Coyne – mastering
- Matt Green – mixing
- Dave Pensado – mixing (2.01)
- Mark "Spike" Stent – mixing (1.01–05, 1.07, 2.02–03, 2.05–08)
- Andrew Wuepper – mixing, mix assistant (2.01)
- Randy Urbanski – mixing, mix assistant (2.01)
- Jaycen Joshua – mixing (2.01)
- Matt Green – mix assistant (tracks 1.01–05, 1.07, 2.02–03, 2.05–08)
- Bama Boyz – producer
- Harold Lilly – production (2.07)
- Ramon Owen – production (2.06)
- Blac Elvis – production (2.07)
- Radio Killa – production
- Lisa Logan – other contributions

== Charts ==
=== Weekly charts ===
Weekly chart performance for I Am... Sasha Fierce
Chart (2008–2010)	Peak position
Australian Albums (ARIA)	3
Australian Urban Albums (ARIA)	1
Austrian Albums (Ö3 Austria)	20
Belgian Albums (Ultratop Flanders)	10
Belgian Albums (Ultratop Wallonia)	32
Brazilian Albums (ABPD)	2
Canadian Albums (Billboard)	6
Croatian International Albums (HDU)	1
Czech Albums (ČNS IFPI)	5
Danish Albums (Hitlisten)	25
Dutch Albums (Album Top 100)	6
European Top 100 Albums (Billboard)	3
French Albums (SNEP)	20
German Albums (Offizielle Top 100)	17
Greek Albums (IFPI)	3
Hungarian Albums (MAHASZ)	8
Irish Albums (IRMA)	1
Italian Albums (FIMI)	16
Japanese Albums (Oricon)	3
New Zealand Albums (RMNZ)	3
Norwegian Albums (VG-lista)	2
Polish Albums (ZPAV)	1
Portuguese Albums (AFP)	2
Scottish Albums (Official Charts)	3
South Korean Albums (Circle) I Am... Sasha Fierce (Platinum Edition)	61
South Korean International Albums (Circle) I Am... Sasha Fierce (Platinum Edition)	14
Spanish Albums (Promusicae)	7
Swedish Albums (Sverigetopplistan)	5
Swiss Albums (Schweizer Hitparade)	7
Taiwanese Albums (Five Music)	3
UK Albums (Official Charts)	2
UK R&B Albums (Official Charts)	1
US Billboard 200	1
US Top R&B/Hip-Hop Albums (Billboard)	1

=== Monthly charts ===
Monthly chart performance for I Am... Sasha Fierce
Chart (2008)	Peak position
Argentine Albums (CAPIF)	7

=== Year-end charts ===
2008 year-end chart performance for I Am... Sasha Fierce
Chart (2008)	Position
Australian Albums (ARIA)	50
Australian Hip Hop/R&B Albums (ARIA)	6
Dutch Albums (Album Top 100)	75
French Albums (SNEP)	176
Greek Albums (IFPI)	25
Russian Albums (2M)	9
Swedish Albums (Sverigetopplistan)	66
UK Albums (Official Charts)	38
Worldwide Albums (IFPI)	12

2009 year-end chart performance for I Am... Sasha Fierce
Chart (2009)	Position
Australian Albums (ARIA)	10
Australian Hip Hop/R&B Albums (ARIA)	2
Austrian Albums (Ö3 Austria)	69
Belgian Albums (Ultratop Flanders)	14
Belgian Albums (Ultratop Wallonia)	57
Brazilian Albums (BPD)	3
Brazilian International Albums (ABPD)	1
Canadian Albums (Billboard)	12
Danish Albums (Hitlisten)	58
Dutch Albums (Album Top 100)	11
European Top 100 Albums (Billboard)	4
French Albums (SNEP)	104
German Albums (Offizielle Top 100)	42
Hungarian Albums (MAHASZ)	18
Irish Albums (IRMA)	5
Italian Albums (FIMI)	58
New Zealand Albums (RMNZ)	15
Polish Albums (ZPAV)	53
Spanish Albums (PROMUSICAE)	19
Swedish Albums (Sverigetopplistan)	28
Swiss Albums (Schweizer Hitparade)	31
UK Albums (Official Charts)	7
US Billboard 200	2
US Top R&B/Hip-Hop Albums (Billboard)	1

2010 year-end chart performance for I Am... Sasha Fierce
Chart (2010)	Position
Australian Albums (ARIA)	61
Australian Hip Hop/R&B Albums (ARIA)	9
Belgian Albums (Ultratop Flanders)	24
Brazilian Albums (ABPD)	8
Brazilian International Albums (ABPD)	3
European Top 100 Albums (Billboard)	34
UK Albums (Official Charts)	48
US Billboard 200	84
US Top R&B/Hip-Hop Albums (Billboard)	25

2011 year-end chart performance for I Am... Sasha Fierce
Chart (2011)	Position
Australian Hip Hop/R&B Albums (ARIA)	33
UK Albums (Official Charts)	136

2013 year-end chart performance for I Am... Sasha Fierce
Chart (2013)	Position
Australian Hip Hop/R&B Albums (ARIA)	40

2015 year-end chart performance for I Am... Sasha Fierce
Chart (2015)	Position
Australian Hip Hop/R&B Albums (ARIA)	68
Swedish Albums (Sverigetopplistan)	95

2016 year-end chart performance for I Am... Sasha Fierce
Chart (2016)	Position
Australian Hip Hop/R&B Albums (ARIA)	75
Swedish Albums (Sverigetopplistan)	81
US Billboard 200	154

2017 year-end chart performance for I Am... Sasha Fierce
Chart (2017)	Position
Australian Hip Hop/R&B Albums (ARIA)	55
Swedish Albums (Sverigetopplistan)	90

2018 year-end chart performance for I Am... Sasha Fierce
Chart (2018)	Position
Australian Hip Hop/R&B Albums (ARIA)	59
Swedish Albums (Sverigetopplistan)	68

2019 year-end chart performance for I Am... Sasha Fierce
Chart (2019)	Position
Australian Hip Hop/R&B Albums (ARIA)	63

2023 year-end chart performance for I Am... Sasha Fierce
Chart (2023)	Position
Belgian Albums (Ultratop Flanders)	198

2025 year-end chart performance for I Am... Sasha Fierce
Chart (2025)	Position
Belgian Albums (Ultratop Flanders)	179

=== Decade-end charts ===
2000s-end chart performance for I Am... Sasha Fierce
Chart (2000–09)	Position
US Billboard 200	178

=== All-time charts ===
All-time chart performance for I Am... Sasha Fierce
Chart	Position
Irish Female Albums (IRMA)	14
UK Female Albums (Official Charts) 21st century	23
US Female Albums (Billboard)	68

== Certifications and sales ==
Certifications and sales for I Am... Sasha Fierce
Region	Certification	Certified units/sales
Australia (ARIA)	5× Platinum	350,000^{‡}
Austria (IFPI Austria)	Gold	10,000^{*}
Belgium (BRMA)	Platinum	30,000^{*}
Brazil (Pro-Música Brasil)	2× Diamond+3× Platinum	680,000^{‡}
Canada (Music Canada)	6× Platinum	480,000^{‡}
Denmark (IFPI Danmark)	3× Platinum	60,000^{‡}
GCC (IFPI Middle East)	Platinum	6,000^{*}
Germany (BVMI)	3× Gold	300,000^{‡}
Greece (IFPI Greece)	Platinum	15,000^{^}
Hungary (MAHASZ)	Gold	3,000^{^}
Ireland (IRMA)	2× Platinum	30,000^{^}
Italy Sales in 2008	—	40,000
Italy (FIMI) Sales since 2009	Platinum	60,000^{*}
Japan (RIAJ)	Gold	100,000^{^}
Netherlands (NVPI)	Platinum	60,000^{^}
New Zealand (RMNZ)	5× Platinum	75,000^{‡}
Poland (ZPAV)	2× Platinum	40,000^{*}
Portugal (AFP)	Platinum	20,000^{^}
Russia (NFPF)	Platinum	20,000^{*}
Spain (Promusicae)	2× Platinum	160,000^{^}
Sweden (GLF)	Gold	20,000^{^}
Switzerland (IFPI Switzerland)	Gold	15,000^{^}
United Kingdom (BPI)	6× Platinum	1,800,000^{‡}
United States (RIAA)	7× Platinum	7,000,000^{‡}
Summaries
Europe (IFPI)	2× Platinum	2,000,000^{*}
Worldwide	—	10,000,000
^{*} Sales figures based on certification alone.^{^} Shipments figures based on certification alone.^{‡} Sales+streaming figures based on certification alone.

== Release history ==
Release dates and formats for I Am... Sasha Fierce
Initial release date	Edition	Format(s)	Ref.
November 12, 2008	Deluxe	CD; digital download	
November 14, 2008	Standard	CD; digital download	
September 4, 2009	Platinum	CD and DVD; digital download	
November 20, 2009	Deluxe (reissue)	CD	

== See also ==
- Album era
- List of Billboard 200 number-one albums of 2008
- List of Billboard number-one R&B albums of 2008
- List of number-one urban albums of 2008 (Australia)
- List of number-one albums of 2009 (Ireland)
- List of number-one albums of 2011 (Poland)
- List of best-selling albums in Brazil
- List of top 25 albums for 2009 in Australia
- List of albums which have spent the most weeks on the UK Albums Chart
- List of best-selling albums by women
- List of best-selling albums of the 21st century
