= Broken-Hearted Girl =

2009 Beyoncé song

Single by Beyoncé

from the album I Am... Sasha Fierce
- B-side: "Video Phone"; "Poison"
- Released: August 28, 2009
- Recorded: 2008
- Studio: Roc the Mic (New York City)
- Genre: R&B
- Length: 4:38
- Label: Columbia
- Composers: Mikkel S. Eriksen; Tor Erik Hermansen; Kenneth "Babyface" Edmonds; Beyoncé Knowles
- Lyricists: Edmons; Knowles
- Producers: StarGate; Knowles

Beyoncé singles chronology
| "Sweet Dreams" (2009) | "Broken-Hearted Girl" (2009) | "Video Phone" (2009) |

Music video
- "Broken-Hearted Girl" on YouTube

"Broken-Hearted Girl" is a song by American singer Beyoncé for her third studio album I Am... Sasha Fierce (2008). Written by Beyoncé, Kenneth "Babyface" Edmonds, and production duo Stargate, it was initially a classic rhythm and blues song until Babyface changed the arrangement and chords. The track appears on the I Am... disc, including songs which give a behind-the-scenes glimpse of Beyoncé's life stripped of her make-up and celebrity trappings. The song is a midtempo R&B ballad accompanied by piano, strings, and drum machine beats. The lyrics describe heartache and romantic insecurities.

"Broken-Hearted Girl" was initially announced as the sixth single from I Am... Sasha Fierce in the United States and the fourth elsewhere, but was replaced with "Sweet Dreams". Columbia Records released "Broken-Hearted Girl" outside the United States on August 28, 2009. Critics praised Beyoncé's emotional vocals on the track but had divided opinions on the production. Commercially, the song reached the top 20 in Australia, Brazil, the Czech Republic, Germany, and Ireland. Sophie Muller directed a monochrome accompanying music video for the song, in which Beyoncé's character reminisces about her relationship on a beach in Malibu, California. Beyoncé performed "Broken-Hearted Girl" on the I Am... World Tour (2009–10).

== Writing and production ==
Beyoncé wrote "Broken-Hearted Girl" alongside the Norwegian production team Stargate, which consists of Tor Erik Hermansen and Mikkel Storleer Eriksen. The duo initially composed "Broken-Hearted Girl" as a traditional rhythm and blues song but co-writer Kenneth "Babyface" Edmonds changed one chord and added falsetto vocals. His recording a demo version preceded a rewrite of the backing track chords and the addition of a four-on-the-floor piano; the result was a "grand-piano ballad". According to the sheet music published by EMI, "Broken-Hearted Girl" was composed at a tempo of 84 beats per minute using common time in the key of D minor. Eriksen explained, "I suppose many of our songs are in minor keys. We probably lean towards more a moody, melodic expression. It's what comes most natural for us."

Stargate and Beyoncé produced "Broken-Hearted Girl" in 2008 at Roc the Mic Studios in New York City. Beyoncé arranged & performed the vocals, which Jim Caruana recorded. Eriksen assisted in recording the instrumental track &, along with Hermansen, arranged the music & played the instruments. Mark "Spike" Stent and Matt Green then mixed the track. "Broken-Hearted Girl" is included on the double album I Am... Sasha Fierce as part of the I Am... disc, which features ballads that describe Beyoncé's insecurities about love and depict the person she is "underneath all the makeup, underneath the lights and underneath all the exciting star drama". Beyoncé said she likes to sing ballads because "the music and the emotion in the story is told [sic] so much better. It's a better connection because you can hear it and it's not all these other distractions. [On the I Am disc,] I really wanted people to hear my voice and hear what I had to say."

== Composition and lyrical interpretation ==
"Broken-Hearted Girl"
A 27-second sample of the midtempo ballad, featuring Knowles' emotion-filled vocals, a cascading weepy piano arrangement, strings and a drum pattern that has been considered hollow

"Broken-Hearted Girl" is a midtempo R&B ballad with an airy vocal melody. Beyoncé's vocals are accompanied by strings, a drum machine beat and a cascading melancholy piano that opens the song. The ballad has a Dm–B♭–F(add9)–F–C/E chord progression and a verse-chorus structure. Beyoncé sings the introduction in a low vocal register that heightens her vocal power; in the song, her voice ranges from F_{3} to F_{5}.

According to Beyoncé, the lyrics of "Broken-Hearted Girl" concern a woman's fear of the downsides of love. The protagonist sings about heartache, and the possibility of a breakup due to the decline of her relationship with an unfaithful lover. She wishes that she did not have to experience this emotional hurt. While her lover is out cheating on her, at home the woman wonders if she has the courage to continue the relationship, "now that her rock has turned out to be made of mud", as interpreted by Fraser McAlpine of BBC Music.

The protagonist accepts that her feelings for her lover are too strong, and that she does not have the courage to leave him. She decides to fight for her love and not become the victim, singing emotively: "I don't want a broken heart / And I don't want to play the broken-hearted girl". Despite the desire to have her lover back, she sings, "I know that I love you but let me just say / I don't want to love you in no kind of way". The woman gains confidence, and towards the end of the song, she wants to spend her life with her lover despite the previous letdowns.

== Release ==
"Broken-Hearted Girl" and "Ego" were initially planned for simultaneous release as singles in the United States, but "Broken-Hearted Girl" was replaced with "Sweet Dreams", which became the sixth single from the I Am.. Sasha Fierce. "Ego" and "Sweet Dreams" are both on the Sasha Fierce disc, while the other joint-releases from I Am.. Sasha Fierce included one song from each disc to demonstrate the concept of Beyoncé's conflicting personalities—the album's central theme. "Broken-Hearted Girl" was subsequently released as the seventh overall single from I Am.. Sasha Fierce and the fifth outside the US. The ballad was made available in a two-track digital download in Australia and New Zealand on August 28, 2009. A CD single, featuring the album version of "Broken-Hearted Girl" and an extended remix of "Video Phone", was released in Germany on October 20, 2009.

French electronic musician Alan Braxe produced a different version of "Broken-Hearted Girl" that was released in Europe. It is a bubblegum dance and disco remix with guitars, horns, synthesizers, whips, and snare drums. Braxe reworked the ballad's bridge and made changes to Beyoncé's vocals, such as increasing the speed of her singing. On October 30, 2009, a maxi single was released in Europe that features a radio edit and four remixes. Another maxi single was made available on November 2 in the United Kingdom by RCA Records. Digital extended plays later came out on November 20, 2009, in Australia, New Zealand, and Europe.

== Critical reception ==
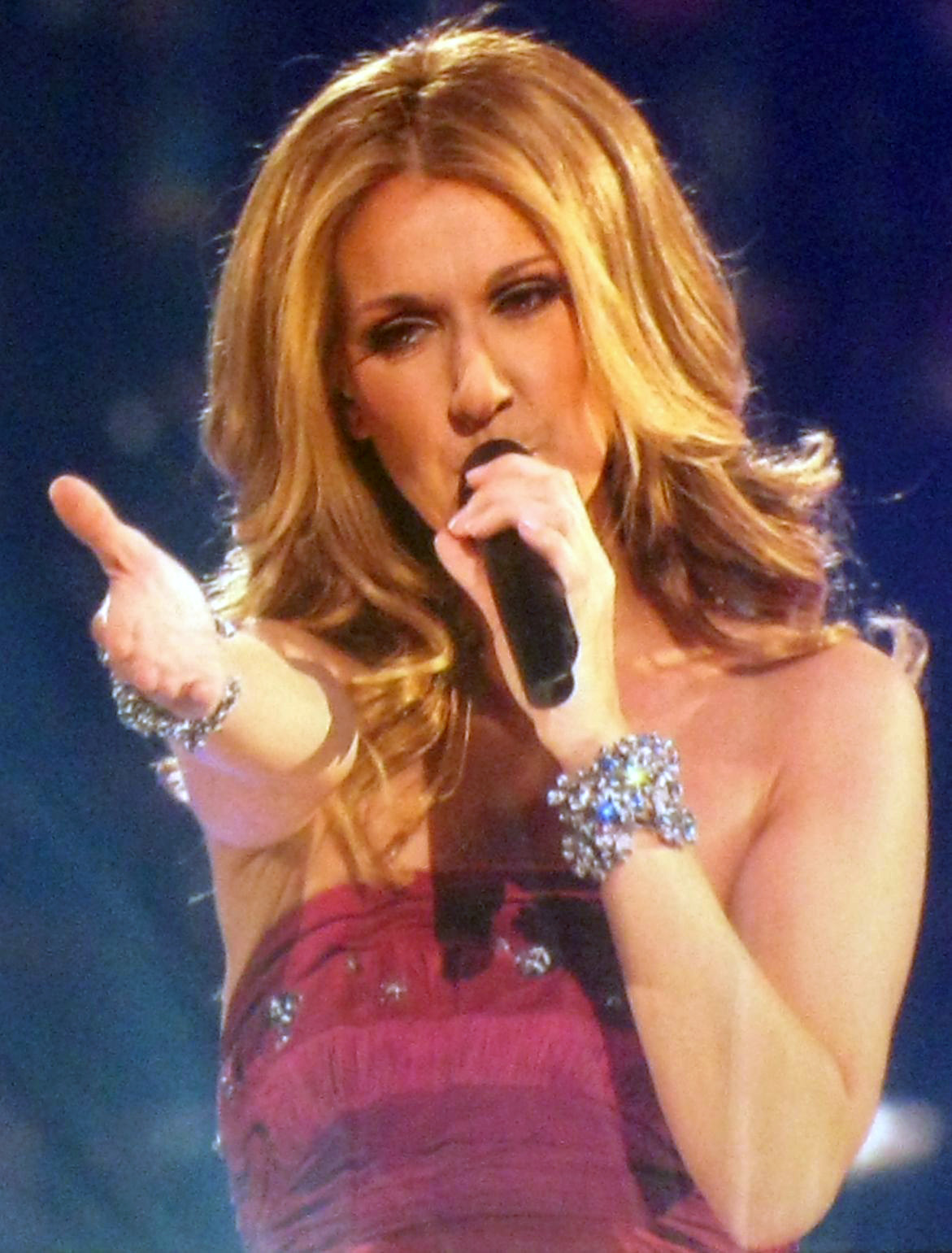
Some critics likened "Broken-Hearted Girl" to the work of Canadian singer Celine Dion.

"Broken-Hearted Girl" received a mixed response from critics. Nana Ekua Brew-Hammond of The Village Voice described the song as "romantic-comedy soundtrack fare", and Colin McGuire of PopMatters commented that the balladry is more similar to the work of Canadian pop singer Celine Dion than American soul singer Aretha Franklin. A writer for the Eastern Daily Press noted that it is a ballad in the vein of Beyoncé's 2008 single "If I Were a Boy" and that Dion would be proud of its "insipid [and] sentimental" balladry. David Riva of The Michigan Daily saw "Broken-Hearted Girl" as "a powerful and emotionally stirring ballad with universal resonance" and one that shows Beyoncé's growth as a songwriter. Jay Lustig of New Jersey On-Line felt that the only standout on the I Am... disc was "Broken-Hearted Girl", which he noted to have a "stately, classic-soul vibe" in contrast to the other ballads on the disc.

Critics had polarized opinions on the production of "Broken-Hearted Girl". Spence D. of IGN Music wrote that "strings create a mournfully thoughtful tone" on the ballad. Mayer Nissim of Digital Spy commended "the pleasant mix of cascading piano and tender strings", but criticized the drum sounds for their hollowness. He nevertheless added that the drums do not prevent the song from being "a classy, well-constructed pop ballad". Nissim concluded that although "the emotion-filled vocals offer yet more proof that [Beyoncé] is one of the finest pop singers of her generation", "Broken-Hearted Girl" is not as catchy as her best work. Darryl Sterdan of Jam! called it a "grand-piano ballad" that may stand out from pop songs on a regular studio album, but seems monotonous on I Am... Sasha Fierce as it is on a disc that contains ballads only. Negative reviews came from The A.V. Club's Michaelangelo Matos, who felt that "Broken-Hearted Girl" sounded "unfinished", and Paste magazine's Jessica Suarez, who said Beyoncé's "commanding voice sounds unusually thin" on the ballad. She was unconvinced by the lyrics, noting that the line, "I don't want to play the broken-hearted girl", "rings false". Ben Westhoff of Las Vegas Weekly wrote that it was difficult to guess what inspired the development of the breakup ballad as Beyoncé married Jay-Z a few months before the album's release.

== Commercial performance ==
On November 14, 2009, "Broken-Hearted Girl" reached number twenty-seven on the UK Singles Chart. Starting on November 21, 2009, the single descended the chart for twelve weeks, last appearing on November 19, 2009. It has been certified silver by the British Phonographic Industry (BPI), for shipment of 200,000 copies in the United Kingdom. "Broken-Hearted Girl" entered the Irish Singles Chart at number thirty-nine on October 8, 2009, and reached number twenty on November 5, 2009. The single spent nine consecutive weeks on the chart, on which it last appeared on December 3, 2009. It attained top twenty positions on the Czech Republic Airplay Chart and the German Singles Chart, respectively peaking at number fifteen and fourteen. "Broken-Hearted Girl" debuted and peaked at number thirty-eight on Austrian Singles Chart. On the Swiss Singles Chart, it peaked at number sixty-two, and charted for three non-consecutive weeks. The ballad made its way to the top ten of the Belgian Tip Charts.

On Australia's ARIA Singles Chart, "Broken-Hearted Girl" debuted at number twenty-eight on September 21, 2009, and ascended to number fifteen the following week. On October 5, 2009, it rose to number fourteen, and was there for an additional week; it lasted for nine consecutive weeks on the chart. "Broken-Hearted Girl" peaked at number four on the ARIA Urban Singles Chart, and emerged as the thirty-seventh best-selling urban single of 2009 in Australia. It reached number ten on the Brazilian Hot 100 Airplay chart in the October 2010 issue.

== Music video ==
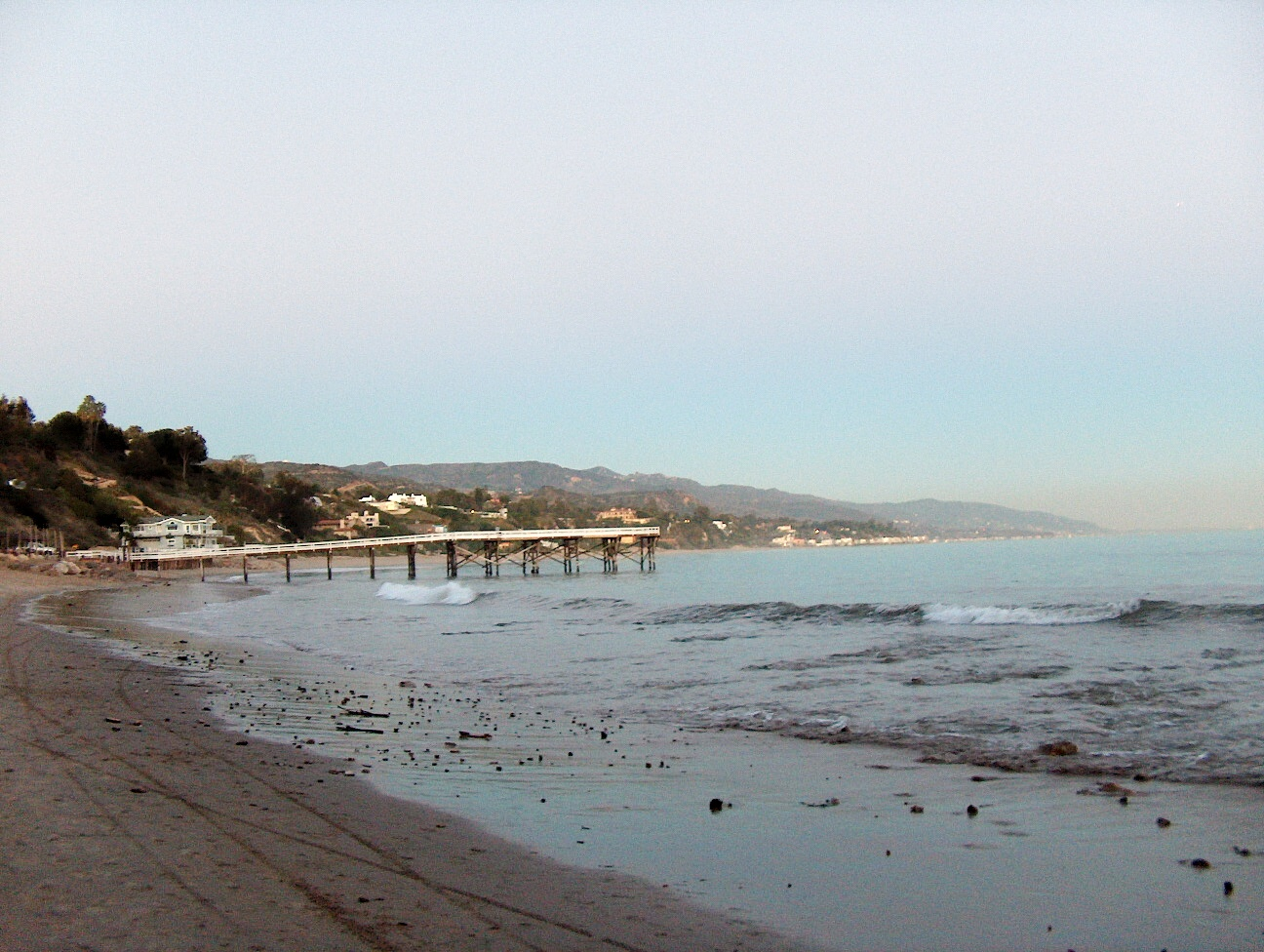
The clip was shot on a beach in Malibu, California (pictured).

The music video for "Broken-Hearted Girl" was directed by Sophie Muller. It was released on the remix and video album Above and Beyoncé – Video Collection & Dance Mixes on June 16, 2009, and through iTunes Stores on November 20, 2009. Most of it had been filmed in black-and-white on a beach in Malibu, California, in late February 2009. The protagonist (Beyoncé) reminisces on an isolated beach about a relationship that went wrong.

The video begins as the protagonist parks her car and cries following an argument she has had with her lover. She then leaves the car, walks towards the sea, and lets down her hair. Flashbacks of the woman and her lover on the beach are shown. With teary eyes, she heads into the sea as waves break the shore. Back in the car, she imagines her lover holding her hands. The video transitions into color, as Beyoncé's character appears on the beach in a green dress and holds a rose without its petals, which she later restores. The video then flashes back to black-and-white memories of the woman resting her head on her lover's shoulder. She eventually realizes that she must set her relationship back on the right track. In the end, she drives off with a smile.

A critic for The Daily Telegraph found the video "sultry". Peter Gigas of E! News wrote that Beyoncé "[looks] exceptionally stunning" even while crying over a poor relationship. He noted that the clip is "simple and straightforward", and connects effectively with viewers who like the ballad.

== Live performances ==
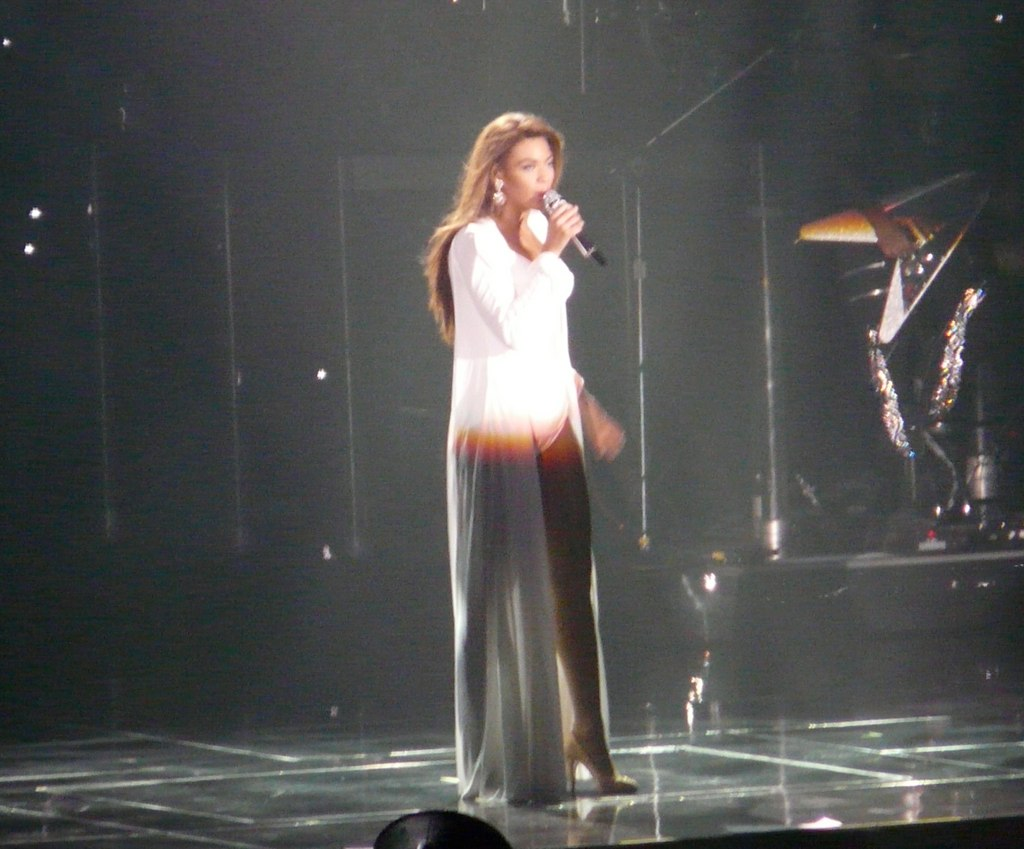
Beyoncé performing "Broken-Hearted Girl" in Antwerp on her I Am... World Tour, 2009

"Broken-Hearted Girl" was in Beyoncé's set list of the worldwide I Am... World Tour (2009–10), which was in support of I Am... Sasha Fierce. The performances of her uptempo songs were followed by a rapid costume change. Wearing a white dress, she sang three ballads from the album in a row; she performed "Broken-Hearted Girl" after singing "Smash into You", on the top of a staircase, and "Ave Maria", for which she changed into a wedding dress. A recorded version of the performance was previewed on the music video website Vevo. It was released on her live album I Am... World Tour on November 29, 2010.

Jay Lustig of New Jersey On-Line commented that the song's performance at the Madison Square Garden on June 21, 2009, had "plenty of blues grit". Jayson Rodriguez of MTV News noted that Beyoncé displayed her softer side while performing the ballad, while Jim Farber of the Daily News said she showed "something more internal and deep". Ben Ratliff of The New York Times criticized the performance, writing that it was "the evening's most comical moment, in a concert involving a bustier made with motorcycle lights". Michael Cragg of musicOMH highlighted that Beyoncé's performance of "Broken-Heated Girl" was better than those of the previous two ballads "because it is allowed to exist on its own terms; a simple song, sung beautifully". The Observer's Barbara Ellen commented that Beyoncé, singing in Zurich in May 2009, was "clawing pathos" on "Broken-Hearted Girl" and "can shape-change at will".

== Formats and track listings ==
Oceania download single

1. "Broken-Hearted Girl" – 4:39
2. "Broken-Hearted Girl" (Catalyst remix) – 4:46

Europe and Oceania digital EP

1. "Broken-Hearted Girl" – 4:37
2. "Video Phone" (extended remix featuring Lady Gaga) – 5:04
3. "Poison" – 4:04

Europe and Oceania digital EP

1. "Broken-Hearted Girl" – 4:37
2. "Video Phone" (extended remix featuring Lady Gaga) – 5:04
3. "Poison" – 4:04
4. "Broken-Hearted Girl" (music video) – 4:39

Germany CD single

1. "Broken-Hearted Girl" – 4:39
2. "Video Phone" (extended remix featuring Lady Gaga) – 5:04

Europe maxi single

1. "Broken-Hearted Girl" (Gareth Wyn remix) – 6:31
2. "Broken-Hearted Girl" (Gareth Wyn remix 128 BPM) – 6:48
3. "Broken-Hearted Girl" (Alan Braxe remix) – 4:18
4. "Broken-Hearted Girl" (Alan Braxe Dub remix) – 7:01
5. "Broken-Hearted Girl" (Olli Collins & Fred Portelli remix) – 6:36
6. "Broken-Hearted Girl" (radio edit) – 3:29

== Credits and personnel ==
Credits are taken from the I Am... Sasha Fierce liner notes.

- Jim Caruana – recording engineer (vocals)
- Kenneth "Babyface" Edmonds – songwriter
- Mikkel Storleer Eriksen – instruments, music recorded by, songwriter
- Matt Green – assistant mixing engineer
- Tor Erik Hermansen – instruments, songwriter
- Beyoncé – vocals, producer, songwriter
- Stargate – producer
- Mark "Spike" Stent – mixing engineer

== Charts ==
=== Weekly charts ===
| Chart (2009–2010) | Peak position |
|---|---|
| Australia (ARIA) | 14 |
| Australia Urban (ARIA) | 4 |
| Austria (Ö3 Austria Top 40) | 38 |
| Belgium (Ultratip Flanders) | 7 |
| Belgium (Ultratip Wallonia) | 9 |
| Brazil (Hot 100 Airplay) | 10 |
| CIS Airplay (TopHit) | 138 |
| Czech Republic (Rádio Top 100) | 15 |
| European Hot 100 Singles (Billboard) | 37 |
| Germany (GfK) | 14 |
| Ireland (IRMA) | 20 |
| Portugal Digital Song Sales (Billboard) | 4 |
| Scottish Singles Sales (Official Charts) | 35 |
| South Korea International (Gaon) | 76 |
| Switzerland (Schweizer Hitparade) | 62 |
| Slovakia (Rádio Top 100) | 39 |
| UK Singles (OCC) | 27 |
| UK R&B (OCC) | 12 |

=== Year-end charts ===
| Chart (2009) | Position |
|---|---|
| Australia Urban (ARIA) | 37 |
| UK Singles (OCC) | 189 |

== Certifications ==
| Region | Certification | Certified units/sales |
|---|---|---|
| Australia (ARIA) | Platinum | 70,000^{‡} |
| Brazil (Pro-Música Brasil) | Platinum | 60,000^{‡} |
| New Zealand (RMNZ) | Gold | 15,000^{‡} |
| United Kingdom (BPI) | Gold | 400,000^{‡} |
| United States (RIAA) | Gold | 500,000^{‡} |
^{‡} Sales+streaming figures based on certification alone.

== Release history ==
Release dates and formats for "Broken-Hearted Girl"
| Region | Date | Format(s) | Label(s) | Ref. |
|---|---|---|---|---|
| Australia | August 28, 2009 | Digital download | Sony Music | |
| New Zealand | August 28, 2009 | Digital download | Sony Music | |
| Australia | August 31, 2009 | CD | Sony Music | |
| Ireland | October 30, 2009 | Digital download (EP) | Sony Music | |
| United Kingdom | November 2, 2009 | CD | RCA | |
| Australia | November 20, 2009 | Digital download (EP) | Sony Music | |
| Germany | November 20, 2009 | CD | Sony Music | |
