= Video Phone (song) =

Single by Beyoncé

from the album I Am... Sasha Fierce
- A-side: "Broken-Hearted Girl"
- Released: September 22, 2009
- Recorded: 2008
- Studio: Bangladesh; PatchWerk; Silent Sound (Atlanta)
- Genre: Crunk
- Length: 3:35 (album version); 5:04 (extended remix)
- Label: Columbia
- Songwriters: Beyoncé Knowles; Shondrae Crawford; Sean Garrett; Angela Beyincé
- Producers: Bangladesh; The Pen; Beyoncé

Beyoncé singles chronology
"Broken-Hearted Girl" (2009)	"Video Phone" (2009)	"Put It in a Love Song" (2010)

Lady Gaga singles chronology
"Bad Romance" (2009)	"Video Phone" (extended remix) (2009)	"Telephone" (2010)

Music video
- "Video Phone" (extended remix) on YouTube

"Video Phone" is a song recorded by American singer Beyoncé and released on September 22, 2009, as the eighth single from her third studio album I Am... Sasha Fierce (2008). Written by Beyoncé, Shondrae Crawford, Angela Beyincé and Sean Garrett, and produced by Beyoncé, Bangladesh and Garrett, the crunk song consists of simple lyrics and hidden innuendos referring to putting up a sexy display to be recorded on a video phone. The extended remix, featuring Lady Gaga, was produced by Vybe Chyle and released on November 17. Soon after, Gaga featured Beyoncé on her song "Telephone".

"Video Phone" received generally mixed reviews from music critics. Some noted that Gaga's featured appearance on the song's remix failed to add anything to the tune. The original version charted in the lower regions of the charts in Australia, Spain, and the United Kingdom, while the remix peaked at number 65 on the US Billboard Hot 100 and atop the US Dance Club Songs chart.

The accompanying music video filmed for the remix of "Video Phone" portrayed Beyoncé and Gaga in a number of costumes, brandishing colorful guns towards men and paying homage to the film Reservoir Dogs (1992) and pin-up legend Bettie Page. It received mixed feedback from critics, who felt it was uninteresting and did not present anything new. However, they complimented the costumes and the cinematic homage of the video. The video went on to win the BET Award for Video of the Year.

== Background and composition ==
"Video Phone" was written by Beyoncé Knowles, Shondrae Crawford, Sean Garrett, Angela Beyincé and Lady Gaga in the remixed version. It was produced by Bangladesh, The Pen and Knowles. Initially, "Video Phone" was sent to US urban contemporary radios on September 22, 2009. In October 2009, Life & Style reported that Knowles and pop singer Lady Gaga were collaborating for a remixed version of the song. The remixed version featured both Knowles and Lady Gaga trading verses with one another. The remixed version of the song that features Lady Gaga was included on the 2009 deluxe edition of I Am... Sasha Fierce.

Musically, "Video Phone" is a crunk song. According to the sheet music published at Sheetmusicplus.com by Hal Leonard Corporation, the song is set in the time signature of common time, with a moderate groove tempo of 79 beats per minute and in the key of E♭ minor. It consists of simple lyrics, with hidden innuendos, and is backed by thin-spread beats; Knowles and Gaga uttering gasps and groans while singing the song. Chris Willman from Yahoo! said that the lyrics are a "celebration of Skype sex and putting on a solo show, on camera, for a guy you just met at the club."

The female protagonist sings how she will dance for a man, while he is filming her with his videophone, this being illustrated in the line, "Press 'record' and I'll let you film me", and "You want me naked? If you like this position you can tape it". According to James Reed of The Boston Globe the lines "What? You want me naked/ If you likin' this position, you can tape it" are sung with an accent which was "part Long Island, part Barbados". Michaelangelo Matos of The A.V. Club commented that "Video Phone" is very similar to Missy Elliott's songs. Rolling Stone's Christian Hoard and The Washington Post's J. Freedom du Lac found similarities between "Video Phone" and the songs by rock band Nine Inch Nails. San Francisco Chronicle's Aidin Vaziri noted that the song sounded like it was swiped from Björk.

== Critical reception ==
The song received mixed reviews. Alexis Petridis from The Guardian compared the song to "Diva", stating that "Video Phone" is "Almost equally weird, but much better, [and it] introduces us to the unlikely figure of Beyoncé Knowles, amateur pornographer: 'You want me naked? If you like this position you can tape it.' She doesn't make for the world's most believable Reader's Wife, but it doesn't matter, because the spare, eerie backdrop of groans and echoing electronics is so thrilling." A writer of Rolling Stone said that Knowles sings in a "dirty groove on the slippery" song. Colin McGuire from PopMatters wrote that "'Video Phone' is sexy enough to the point where it almost becomes uncomfortable to think of her listening back to this with her father in the room." Daniel Brockman of The Phoenix noted that the song was "smutty" for an artist like Knowles. J. Freedom du Lac of The Washington Post chose the song as a highlight on I Am... Sasha Fierce saying, "The moaning, groaning 'Video Phone' positions Beyoncé as the star of a sex tape set to a thrillingly spare soundtrack that sounds like a Nine Inch Nails instrumental." A negative review for the song was given by Bernard Zuel of The Sydney Morning Herald who described it as "awful".

For the collaboration, Fraser McAlpine from BBC Radio 1 reviewed the song negatively, writing: "So anyway, this brings me to 'Video Phone' – and what exactly is the point of Gaga featuring in this song? I know Beyoncé fans won't like me saying this, but I can't help but think that in this instance it's a case of 'if you can't beat em, join em' [...] For someone as naturally brilliant as Beyoncé (and a better singer than Gaga and Rihanna put together), perhaps she should actually stop trying so hard and do what she does best - singing proper songs." Chris Willman from Yahoo! compared the song to Gaga's "Telephone", where Knowles appears as a featured artist, and wrote that "Maybe it's because the lack of a video for Gaga's 'Telephone' leaves more to the imagination, but if this were a contest, I'd have to say her tune trumps Beyoncé's. [...] [Her] greatest promises of unbridled exhibitionism can't quite make the genre feel fresh." The New York Times' Jon Caramanica commented that "Video Phone" and "Telephone", "promised a new direction, but all Beyoncé did was show up to prove she could out-Gaga Gaga, then return to her comfort zone." Kyle Anderson of MTV, felt that "Gaga got a bit lost in the mix" of "Video Phone". David Balls of the website Digital Spy gave a negative review for the remix version, grading it two out of five stars. He further commented,

"Needless to say, the pair work their superstar pulling power for all it's worth. Over sparse and eerie beats, they deliver innuendo-laced lyrics, groan near-orgasmically and generally tease us with the prospect of doing all sorts of naughty things on, well, your video phone. While the promo clip offers some of the intended thrill, the track itself - single number eight from I Am... - lacks the sparkle of previous offerings. It may provide a brief rush of excitement to the loins, but ultimately leaves you feeling fluffed rather than fully-serviced by the twosome."

On The Village Voice's 2009 Pazz & Jop singles list, "Video Phone" was ranked at number 307.

== Chart performance ==
Upon release as a single in 2009, "Video Phone" debuted at number 70 on the Hot R&B/Hip-Hop Songs chart and eventually peaked at 37. I Am... Sasha Fierce became the first album of the 21st century to have seven entries on this chart, following "Single Ladies (Put a Ring on It)", "If I Were a Boy", "Diva", "Halo", "Ego" and "Sweet Dreams". On the week ending December 12, 2009, the extended remix of "Video Phone" debuted on the Billboard Hot 100 at number 65, due to digital downloads. The song sold 28,000 copies in its first week, 93% of which were for the extended remix though radio stations preferred to spin the original album version. "Video Phone" also became Knowles' fourteenth number-one Hot Dance Club Songs chart-topper. It is also her sixth consecutive chart-topper. According to Nielsen SoundScan, the combined versions of "Video Phone" has sold 287,000 copies as of June 2010.

In Australia, the original version of the song debuted at 89 and peaked at 66 on the ARIA Singles Chart. The remixed version debuted at 40 on November 30, 2009, and peaked at 31 the next week. The original and the remixed version, respectively, both peaked at 29 on the ARIA Urban Chart. In New Zealand, the remixed version debuted at 33 and peaked at 32 after two weeks. In the United Kingdom, the original version of "Video Phone" debuted on the UK Singles Chart at 91, and peaked at 58. The original and remixed version peaked on the UK R&B Chart at 21 and 36 respectively. Across Europe, the remixed version of the song charted outside the official charts in Belgium (Flanders and Wallonia). In the Czech Republic, the extended remix of "Video Phone" debuted at thirty-nine on issue date February 17, 2010.

== Music video ==
=== Background and concept ===
For her appearance in the music video, Lady Gaga (right) chose to adopt a "Gee-yoncé" persona.

A music video for the extended remix of "Video Phone" was directed by Hype Williams, along with producer Cisco Newman and art director Lenny Tso. On October 15, 2009, a spokesperson for Williams confirmed to MTV, that reports of Gaga and Beyoncé working on the music video together were true. It was shot at Brooklyn's Greenpoint neighborhood, under tight security. The artists were reported to be wearing fashionable dresses, with Knowles in "a feathered dress" and Gaga sporting "something wild". In an interview with New York's Z100 radio station, Gaga further commented on her collaboration with Knowles, for the music video. She said, "When I was doing her video with her, she called me and she said, 'What do you want to do?' [...] And I'm like, 'I don't want to show up in some frickin' hair bow and be fashion Gaga in your video.' I said, 'I want to do you.' [...] I want to do my version of Beyoncé. So the whole time I was learning the choreography they were calling me Gee-yoncé." Later, during an interview with MTV News, she explained:

"What I was excited about is with B[eyoncé], I had no ego. Neither of us had an ego. It wasn't about competition. It was about, like, 'Man let's give the world what they want. Let's do a real girl-power collaboration where we support one another.' I said, 'I want to do you in your video, and I want to tribute you. I want to dress up like you'. And Hype Williams ... was so excited. He was like, 'Gaga I want no makeup on your face.' It was really stripped down — real Beyoncé hair, and we wore the same outfit in the video, and I [paid tribute to] her. [...] I wanted to [work with her] because this was an era for her in her career where she defined herself aesthetically. And that should be applauded that a woman did that. She's so great at what she does."

The video was initially set to premiere on November 5, 2009 but did not actually premiere until November 17, 2009. Screencaps from the video were released ahead of its premiere, while a video preview appeared online on November 16, 2009, one day before its official release.

=== Synopsis ===
The video begins with Knowles walking down an alley, accompanied by several men in suits, an homage to Quentin Tarantino's 1992 film Reservoir Dogs. As the main section of the song begins, cameras zoom in on Knowles as she dances in a black and white latex leotard while holding sunglasses with hand signals on them. When the first verse begins, Knowles seductively dances for two men who have cameras as heads. Another scene shows her teasing men with futuristic toy guns while wearing a skin-colored latex top. During Gaga's verse, she and Knowles appear wearing white leotards; they both sing to the camera while shooting more toy guns in open fire. Knowles next brandishes a bow and fires arrows at a cameraman who's strapped to a rotating dart board. She and Gaga, now in front of a white backdrop, perform a synchronized dance together, with Gaga wearing a pair of yellow Louboutins heels. Knowles then appears dressed as an homage to Bettie Page, while handling several different firearms. Throughout the video, the two singers fire their guns and arrows at men. The video ends with Knowles shooting a gun while perched upon a stationary motorcycle and surrounded by images from the start of the video.

=== Reception ===
"Now, because Gaga is just a guest in B[eyoncé]'s world, she has to tone down the crazy, which gives us a glimpse at what she would look like if she were just a normal pop star: No over-the-top costumes, silly makeup or razor sunglasses—just a good old wind machine, long perfect blond weave and leotard. Pretty underwhelming. But this is really Beyoncé's music video, so let's not forget about her. While the song is not 'Single Ladies' catchy, that doesn't stop B[eyoncé] from bringing the fierce, even when it means ripping off Rihanna's style at the beginning or Bettie Page in the middle. And she does look cute all '40s pinup style, so no complaints here."

— Jennifer Cady of E! Online talking about the video for "Video Phone".

James Montgomery from MTV commented that "it's a little surprising that the just-released clip for Beyoncé's 'Video Phone' has nary a flame or fish-eye shot (there are, of course, plenty of outlandish costumes). However, don't make the mistake of thinking this video is by any means straightforward — it's plenty WTF! [...] It's definitely not the Gaga we're used to seeing, but her appearance isn't exactly run-of-the-mill, either. And neither is this video, for that matter. Especially not when you're watching Beyoncé snap her gum and shake her hips and grope an AK-47 while the screen pops from electric green to Kool-Aid red." Jocelyn Vena of the same publication noted, "The clip is charged with energy, and the cynics out there might wonder if putting two sizzling divas in a room together created any kind of rivalry." Jim Farber from New York's Daily News compared Knowles' look to that of pin-up model Bettie Page, and said "The clip for 'Video Phone' [...] doesn't offer much in the way of chemistry or even interaction between the two divas. [The] clip seems about as innovative as a rotary dial up." Daniel Kreps from Rolling Stone commented that the video was an "almost seizure-inducing parade of cinematic homages and wardrobe changes." He also compared Knowles' look to Page, as well as Katy Perry and rapper M.I.A.

New York magazine's Amy Odell commented that "The intricacy of her [Knowles'] wardrobe [in the video] suggests she's feeling the Gaga pressure." She further added: "In a burgeoning phenomenon we might call the Gaga Effect, divas everywhere may feel the pressure to push avant-garde fashion to the max to keep up with the pantsless wonder. Beyoncé's fashion efforts in 'Video Phone' — which make her epic diva money fan a mere distant memory — deserve a look-by-look analysis, because she tried really hard." In another review, she said "Together they play with colored fire-spitting water guns and look like the best of diva friends." Entertainment Weekly's Leah Greenblatt commented that the video was "B[eyoncé]'s show—La[dy] Gaga's just guesting in it." Greenblatt also praised the fashion designs used in the video and the Bettie Page "vibes". Spin's Chris Zakorchemny felt that Gaga "does her best Beyonce impression" in the video for the song. However, he said that "Even with Gaga involved, the Hype Williams-produced video doesn't veer too much into the weird; it's certainly not Gaga-setting-men-on-fire weird." Margaret Wappler of The Arizona Republic praised the video saying that it had "electrifying color schemes and high-shine lighting, resulting in a fantastical pop mirage between Lady Gaga and Beyonce". She further called it a "kinetic spectacle to behold, with enough guns to make Ted Nugent weep with jealousy and some hot Bettie Page bangs on Beyonce that should prompt plenty of ladies to run to the hairdresser". Wappler finished her review by concluding that "the whole video has a distinct and not unpleasant 90s vibe." Francesca Stabile of The Village Voice gave a positive review for the video praising the outfits used in the video and the "oversized sequined sweater that makes an appearance toward the end".

=== Achievements ===
The music video ranked at ninety-nine on BET: Notarized Top 100 Videos of 2009 countdown. In 2010, the music video of "Video Phone" received a nomination at the 2010 MTV Video Music Awards Japan, in the category of "Best Collaboration Video". The video received two nominations at the BET Awards 2010 for "Video of the Year" and for "Best Collaboration", winning the former category on April 27, 2010. On August 3, 2010, the video received five nominations at the 2010 MTV Video Music Awards, in the categories of Best Choreography, Best Collaboration, Best Pop Video, Best Female Video and Best Art Direction.

== Track listing and formats ==
- US/UK CD single
1. "Video Phone" (Album Version) – 3:35
2. "Video Phone" (Instrumental) – 3:27
- International download bundle
1. "Video Phone" – 3:35
2. "Video Phone" (Extended remix featuring Lady Gaga) – 5:04
3. "Poison" – 4:04
- UK digital download Remix Bundle
1. "Video Phone" (Extended remix featuring Lady Gaga) – 5:04
2. "Video Phone" (Gareth Wyn remix) – 7:53
3. "Video Phone" (Oli Collins & Fred Portelli remix) – 7:02
4. "Video Phone" (Doman & Gooding Playhouse Vocal Remix) – 6:33
5. "Video Phone" (My Digital Enemy remix) – 7:00
6. "Video Phone" (Gareth Wyn remix radio edit) – 3:57

== Credits and personnel ==
Credits are taken from I Am... Sasha Fierce liner notes.

- Beyoncé – Primary artist, producer
- Lady Gaga – Featured artist, extended remix
- Tom Coyne – Mastering
- Mark "Spike" Stent - Mixing Engineer
- Jim Caruana – Vocal Engineer
- Eddy Schreyer – Mastering, extended remix
- William "Vybe Chyle" Burke – Mixing Engineer, extended remix
- Mathew Knowles – Executive producer
- Miles Walker – Engineer
- Bangladesh – Producer
- Phlex – choreographer

== Charts ==
=== Weekly charts ===
Weekly chart performance for "Video Phone"
Chart (2009–2010)	Peak position
Australia (ARIA)	31
Australian Urban (ARIA)	9
Belgium (Ultratip Bubbling Under Flanders)	4
Belgium (Ultratip Bubbling Under Wallonia)	14
Brazil (Hot 100 Airplay)	5
CIS Airplay (TopHit)	149
Croatia International Airplay (HRT)	8
Czech Republic Airplay (ČNS IFPI)	39
Global Dance Tracks (Billboard)	10
Italy (FIMI)	14
Netherlands (Dutch Top 40 Tipparade)	9
New Zealand (Recorded Music NZ)	32
Russia Airplay (Tophit)	149
South Korea International (Gaon)	75
UK Singles (Official Charts)	58
UK Hip Hop/R&B (Official Charts)	21
UK Hip Hop/R&B (Official Charts) Featuring Lady Gaga	36
US Billboard Hot 100 Featuring Lady Gaga	65
US Dance Club Songs (Billboard) Featuring Lady Gaga	1
US Hot R&B/Hip-Hop Songs (Billboard)	37

=== Year-end chart ===
2010 year-end chart performance for "Video Phone"
Chart (2010)	Position
Croatia International Airplay (HRT)	69
US Dance Club Songs (Billboard)	36

== Certifications and sales ==
Certifications and sales for "Video Phone"
Region	Certification	Certified units/sales
Australia (ARIA)	Gold	35,000^{‡}
United States (RIAA)	Platinum	1,000,000^{‡}
^{‡} Sales+streaming figures based on certification alone.

== Release history ==
Release dates and formats for "Video Phone"
Region	Date	Version(s)	Format(s)	Label(s)	Ref.
United States	September 22, 2009	Original	Urban contemporary radio	Columbia; Music World	
United States	November 17, 2009	Original	CD	Columbia; Music World	
France	November 20, 2009	Original; remix	Digital download (EP)	Sony Music	
Italy	November 20, 2009	Remix	Radio airplay	Sony Music	
United Kingdom	December 21, 2009	Remixes	Digital download (EP)	RCA	
