= Amy Odell =

American writer and author

- Born: Austin, Texas
- Education: New York University
- Occupations: Author, journalist, Editor, and media consultant
- Writing career
- Language: Author; journalist; editor; media consultant; Cosmopolitan editor (formerly)
- Period: 2015–2018
- Notable works: ANNA: The Biography; Tales From the Back Row: An Outsider's View from Inside the Fashion Industry

Amy Odell is an American author, journalist, editor, and media consultant.

Odell grew up in Austin, Texas. She graduated from New York University.

== Career ==
Odell was the former editor for Cosmopolitan. She is the author of a biography of Anna Wintour, entitled Anna: The Biography (2020), which has been translated into French and German. Odell is also the author of Tales From the Back Row: An Outsider's View from Inside the Fashion Industry (2015) and has written a variety of articles in outlets ranging from The Economist to Time Magazine to Business of Fashion.

== Publications ==
=== Articles ===
- Odell, Amy (2018). "Victoria's Secret Created an Impossible Ideal of Sexy. Now It's Struggling to Stay Relevant". Time Magazine.
- Odell, Amy (2018). "The Facebook Crisis: A Survival Guide for Media". Business of Fashion.
- Odell, Amy (2018). "Read my lips: the rise and rise of photo-editing - Amy Odell goes in search of the digital facelift". The Economist.
- Odell, Amy (April 28, 2020). "How can I focus on work at home—and motivate my team to do the same—while this global crisis swirls?". Well+Good.

=== Books ===
- Odell, Amy (2015). Tales From the Back Row: An Outsider's View from Inside the Fashion Industry. Simon & Schuster.
- Odell, Amy (2022). ANNA: The Biography. Gallery Books.
- Odell, Amy (2025). Gwyneth: The Biography. Gallery Books.
