= I Am... Yours: An Intimate Performance at Wynn Las Vegas =

2009 live video album by Beyoncé

Live album / video by Beyoncé
- Released: November 23, 2009
- Recorded: August 2, 2009
- Venues: Encore Theater (Paradise, Nevada)
- Genres: Pop; soul; R&B
- Length: 87:48
- Language: English
- Labels: Music World; Columbia
- Director: Nick Wickham

Beyoncé chronology
Above and Beyoncé: Video Collection & Dance Mixes (2009)	I Am... Yours: An Intimate Performance at Wynn Las Vegas (2009)	I Am... World Tour (2010)

Beyoncé video chronology
Above and Beyoncé: Video Collection & Dance Mixes (2009)	I Am... Yours: An Intimate Performance at Wynn Las Vegas (2009)	I Am... World Tour (2010)

I Am... Yours: An Intimate Performance at Wynn Las Vegas is the third live and fourth video album by American singer and songwriter Beyoncé. It was released on November 23, 2009 through Music World Entertainment and Columbia Records. The album was recorded at the Encore Theater in Paradise, Nevada, being filmed by Ed Burke, on August 2, 2009, during a stint of Beyoncé's I Am... World Tour (2009–2010). It features performances of over thirty songs, including her solo material, her recordings with the girl group Destiny's Child as well as behind-the-scenes footage. The film was directed by Nick Wickham and produced by Emer Patten.

Footage from the film, titled Beyoncé – I Am... Yours, aired on the American Broadcasting Company (ABC) on November 26, 2009. The special featured behind-the-scenes footage of Beyoncé's I Am... World Tour and it was watched by over 5.2 million viewers. The album was also promoted by being broadcast on Channel 4 in the United Kingdom and reissued in the form of a live instrumentals album. Upon its release, I Am... Yours: An Intimate Performance at Wynn Las Vegas received positive reviews from music critics, who generally praised the acoustic live performances of the songs. Beyoncé's vocals, the intimate performances, and the narrating story of the album were also complimented. The live version of "Halo", which is featured on the album, was nominated for a Grammy Award for Best Female Pop Vocal Performance at the 53rd Annual Grammy Awards (2011).

I Am... Yours: An Intimate Performance at Wynn Las Vegas stayed atop the US Top Music Videos for eight weeks, and was certified double platinum by the Recording Industry Association of America (RIAA), denoting shipments of 200,000 copies. It became Beyoncé's second number-one DVD in the United States and has spent fifty-two weeks on the Top Music Videos. The album was also successful on the DVD and albums charts across the world and was certified platinum by the Australian Recording Industry Association (ARIA) for selling over 15,000 copies.

== Background and development ==
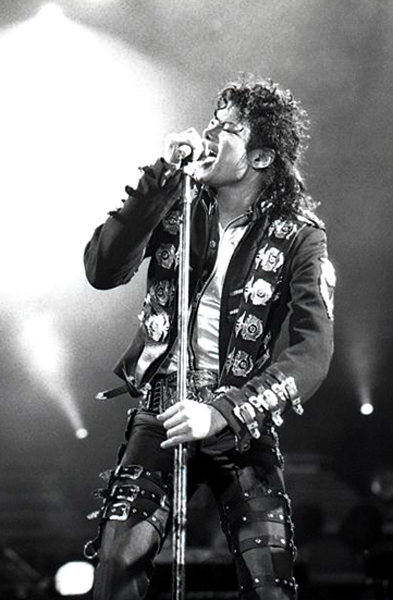
Beyoncé covered "I Wanna Be Where You Are" by Michael Jackson (pictured) during the revue.

Between July 30–August 2, 2009, Beyoncé had a revue titled I Am... Yours at the Encore Theater in Wynn Las Vegas during a stint on her worldwide I Am... World Tour (2009–2010). Her performance was backed by her all-female band Suga Mama and an orchestra. The show was choreographed by Beyoncé and Frank Gatson Jr. Regarding her I Am... Yours revue, Beyoncé said: "I've always wanted to perform in Las Vegas, I've always wanted to do my own show there, because a lot of the icons that I look up to had amazing shows in Las Vegas. I thought if I'm going to have my own Las Vegas show, it has to be right and it has to have heart and soul and it has to be something memorable... My whole objective here is for people to see what they don't get to see. Just give me my band, give me a stage, some cool smoke and lights and you see the sweat, you see the pain, you see the love, you see the soul and it's about music."

According to Beyoncé's father and then-manager, Music World Entertainment president and CEO Mathew Knowles, the decision to release I Am... Yours: An Intimate Performance at Wynn Las Vegas was prompted by the way the music was presented in the digital world and because "the live experience is becoming more important". He added that the live performances show the ability of the artists to entertain live, something that, according to him, "Beyoncé has proven [...] time after time". The film was directed by Nick Wickham and produced by Emer Patten. It was filmed by Ed Burke and executively produced by Beyoncé, Mathew Knowles and Sheira Rees-Davies.

== Film synopsis ==
The show begins with a narrator introducing Beyoncé to the audience. She appears from the back of the theater performing "Hello". She greets the audience and makes her way towards the stage as she continues to perform. At the stage, Beyoncé sings "Halo". Next, she performs "Irreplaceable" and interacts with the audience. She later moves into an acoustic medley, performing a down-tempo version of "Sweet Dreams", "Dangerously in Love 2" and "Sweet Love" (originally recorded by Anita Baker). The medley leads into "If I Were a Boy" (which contains excerpts from "You Oughta Know", originally recorded by Alanis Morissette) and "Scared of Lonely". The show continues with a performance of "That's Why You're Beautiful", intertwined with excerpts from "The Beautiful Ones" (originally recorded by Prince), "Satellites" and "Resentment". The first act concludes with Beyoncé performing a jazz-fused version of "Déjà Vu". Before the next act begins, three dancers appear and perform a tap sequence called "Bebop".

Beyoncé begins the second act by telling the story of her career, starting from when she was nine years old to her third studio album I Am... Sasha Fierce (2008). Beyoncé highlights one of the first songs she remembers learning was Michael Jackson's "I Wanna Be Where You Are". She continues with a medley of Destiny's Child's hit songs, including "No No No", "Bug a Boo", "Bills, Bills, Bills", and "Say My Name" whilst in between the songs, she talks about the story behind them. The medley leads into "Work It Out" and "'03 Bonnie & Clyde, as she begins to talk about the start her solo career. As the set continues, Beyoncé explains how her record company felt her debut album did not have one hit song, to which she sarcastically remarks: "I guess they were kinda right... I had five." Beyoncé goes on to perform "Crazy in Love" (reminiscent of "Proud Mary" by Tina Turner), "Naughty Girl" and "Get Me Bodied". As the show draws to a close, Beyoncé performs "Single Ladies (Put a Ring on It)"; she then exits the stage after thanking the audience for their presence.

== Release and promotion ==
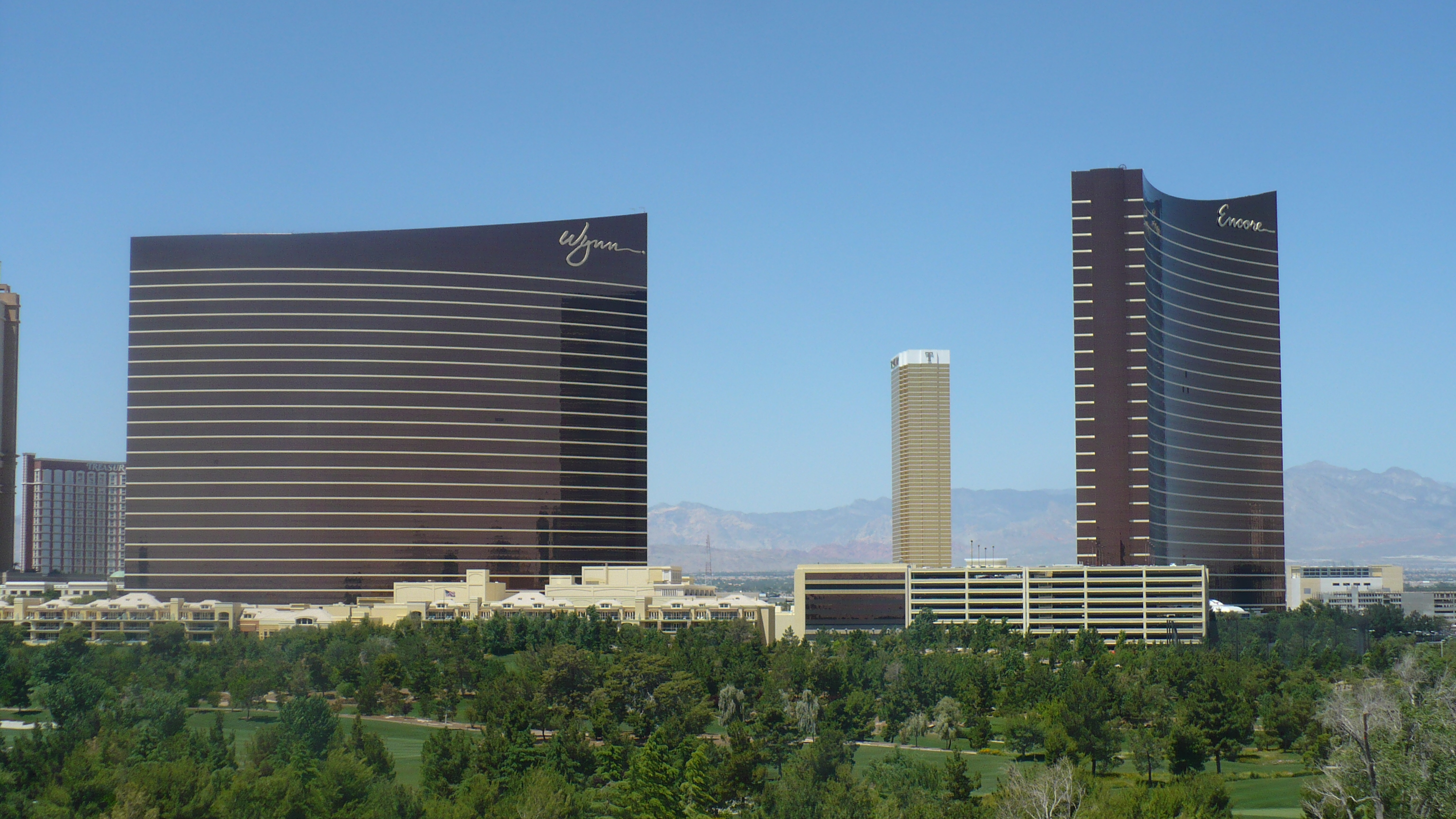
I Am... Yours was filmed at the Encore Theater in Wynn Las Vegas.

After Beyoncé finished her I Am... Yours revue, several publications reported that a live album containing the performance of the revue would be released. In early November 2009, it was announced that she would be releasing a concert performance DVD and live CD titled I Am... Yours: An Intimate Performance at Wynn Las Vegas. The DVD features performances from the I Am... Yours revue containing performances of over thirty songs, including Beyoncé's solo material as well as her recordings with the girl group Destiny's Child. Exclusive behind-the-scenes footage was also placed on the album; part of which was later added on Beyoncé's sixth video album Live at Roseland: Elements of 4 (2011).

The album was released in the United States on November 23, 2009, the same day the deluxe edition of Beyoncé's third studio album I Am... Sasha Fierce was reissued, as well as the release of her extended play (EP) I Am... Sasha Fierce – The Bonus Tracks. The standard edition (DVD) and deluxe edition (CD+DVD) of the album were released simultaneously. It was released for Blu-ray on December 15, 2009. The DVD and Blu-ray editions feature the entire concert (split into three parts), as well as over twenty-three minutes of behind-the-scenes footage, while the two CDs include the audio from the main performances. On November 26, 2009, American Broadcasting Company (ABC) aired a one-hour Thanksgiving special, titled Beyoncé – I Am... Yours at 9 p.m. A one-minute trailer of the special was posted online on November 12, 2009; it showed Beyoncé during her I Am... World Tour, behind-the-scenes footage including rehearsals, as well as personal videos. According to USA Today, the special was watched by 5.2 million viewers. Entertainment Weekly's Brad Wete commented that she "danced her tail off" during the special. John Griffiths of Us Weekly reviewed the special positively, calling it "shimmery... mostly culled from her lavish concert". He added that she further "dishes about her career, shows off her childhood home videos, belts out her hits and more." The show was broadcast on Channel 4 in the United Kingdom on December 25, 2009 (Christmas Day). A live instrumentals album of the songs performed on the revue was released digitally via Amazon Music and the iTunes Store on September 28, 2010. Several videos of the live performances of "Halo", "Single Ladies (Put a Ring on It)" and "Scared of Lonely" were released in MTV Latin America. These videos were used to promote the album in Latin America as well as the television special titled MTV World Stage: Beyoncé Live from Las Vegas.

== Critical reception ==
Professional ratings
Review scores
Source	Rating
AllMusic	4/5 stars
BBC Online	(favorable)
Jam!	4.5/5 stars
People	3.5/4 stars
The Huffington Post	(favorable)
The New York Times	(favorable)
The Salt Lake Tribune	(A−)

Tanya Remekie of Rap-Up felt that the album contains a "show-stopping event as Sasha Fierce and Bey[oncé] come out to play". She finished her review by writing that the "Broadway-fashioned narration of her life story, told through song and dance.. shares her magical story." During a review of the album, the writers of People magazine rated it with three-and-a-half out of four stars and wrote that it "offers nicely subdued versions of her hits", further describing the show as a "magic". Another writer of the same publication praised the album, writing that "You'll get to know Beyoncé like never before". Similarly, a writer of Eye Weekly called the album "extraordinary", before adding that it is "the chance to experience her (Beyoncé) up close and personal". A writer of Us Weekly said that to see Beyoncé's "fiereceness", people should listen to her album I Am... Sasha Fierce or buy the DVD I Am... Yours: An Intimate Performance at Wynn Las Vegas to see the live experience. AllMusic's Andy Kellman awarded I Am... Yours: An Intimate Performance at Wynn Las Vegas a rating of four out of five stars, describing it as a "theatrical production worthy of Vegas, with Beyoncé and her large backing band energetically rolling [through Beyoncé's songs]". He noted that "what makes I Am...Yours stand apart from a typical live-album cash-in is the mostly unexpected covers that are weaved into the set." Kellman finished his review by writing, "As live albums go, this is not quite destined to be one of those all-time classics; a couple missing songs and a little too much talk aside, however, the fans couldn't ask for more."

Ed Masley of The Arizona Republic praised the intimacy of the concert and the acoustic versions of the songs. A writer of The Boston Globe also gave I Am... Yours: An Intimate Performance at Wynn Las Vegas a positive review, comparing it with Sin City. He commended the jazz interlude, the acoustic rearrangements of the songs, and the "charming B[eyoncé] telling her life story in [the] song[s]". Darryl Sterdan of the website Jam! also compared the album with Sin City and commented: "Only Beyoncé would think an 'intimate' theatre gig should include her massive all-girl band, an orchestra, lasers, dancers, costume changes and a wind machine to keep her hair blowing majestically. And only Beyoncé could pull it all together as superbly as she does in this 98-minute... show". Grading I Am... Yours: An Intimate Performance at Wynn Las Vegas with an A− and calling it the "best live concert film of the year", David Burger of The Salt Lake Tribune concluded, "Instead of a traditional retread of her hits, she narrates and emotionally sings her way through a souful musical journey that takes her from her first audition song to the mega-hits she unleashed this past year... This is a thrilling tour de force."

Likewise, Mike Diver of BBC Online reviewed the album positively, praising the narrating story of the performances, calling it "polished, [and] professional". Diver further noted that Beyoncé's vocals "peak and dip, tremble and roar, mercifully without ever hitting Mariah Carey levels of skull-rattling intensity". He added that the album would look predictable because it was an "entirely second-guessable affair with each movement telegraphed and every realigned arrangement (bombast turned down, jazz and funk switched up) meeting the listener's expectations head on". The Huffington Post's Mike Ragogna compared Beyoncé with Diana Ross during the concert, adding, "Beyoncé's I Am...Yours is a satisfying decade-and-then-some retrospective that reveals the artist's interesting back story with a personal warmth". Nate Chinen of The New York Times noted that the album documents a smaller show than the other ones Beyoncé usually makes. He further stated, "But the stagecraft — wind machines, lasers, arena lighting — keeps a viewer at a worshipful remove... Of course Beyoncé has always fared better with declaration than with disclosure, framing her sentiments as actions. Still, the old-fashioned extravagance of this production... feels like some kind of honesty: it's a sincere gesture from a show-business savant."

== Accolades ==
Before the release of I Am... Yours: An Intimate Performance at Wynn Las Vegas, Rap-Up listed it as one of the "most notable releases" for the fall of 2009. Likewise, MTV News placed the album on its list of "Holiday Album Preview". USA Today's Mike Snider also mentioned it on his list of "Music-video DVDs that make worthy gifts this season" comparing its acoustic style to the VH1 Storytellers series. Jay Lustig of New Jersey On-Line listed I Am... Yours: An Intimate Performance at Wynn Las Vegas in two of his lists of most notable albums in the fourth quarter of 2009. Mark Edward Nero of the website About.com put it in his list of "2009 Holiday Gift Guide for R&B Fans". The live performance of "Halo", which is featured on the album, was nominated for a Grammy Award for Best Female Pop Vocal Performance at the 53rd Annual Grammy Awards (2011). The live recording peaked at number fifty-eight on the Canadian Hot 100. On The Village Voice's 2009 Pazz & Jop albums list, the album was ranked at number one-thousand-six-hundred-and-forty-three.

== Commercial performance ==
I Am... Yours: An Intimate Performance at Wynn Las Vegas debuted at number one on the US Top Music Videos, becoming Beyoncé's second number-one DVD in the country. The following week, it fell to number two, but later rebounded to the top where it stayed for the next seven consecutive weeks. It spent ten weeks inside the top five – eight of them at the top. By the end of 2009, the album sold 99,000 copies in the United States, making it the sixth best-selling music DVD of the year. As of December 29, 2010, it had sold 162,000 units in the United States, and was ranked at number fifteen on the DVD year-end chart of 2010. It additionally became the best-selling music video of 2010 in the US. It was certified double platinum by the Recording Industry Association of America (RIAA) for shipping over 200,000 copies. I Am... Yours: An Intimate Performance at Wynn Las Vegas spent a total of fifty-two weeks on the US Top Music Videos.

Outside the United States, I Am... Yours: An Intimate Performance at Wynn Las Vegas peaked at number eleven on both Australian Music DVD Chart and the Australian Urban Albums Chart. It was certified platinum by the Australian Recording Industry Association (ARIA), denoting sales of over 15,000 copies. It became the forty-fourth best-selling DVD of 2010 in Australia. On the New Zealand Music DVD Chart, the album peaked at number six. I Am... Yours: An Intimate Performance at Wynn Las Vegas debuted at number twenty-four on the UK R&B Albums on December 19, 2009. The next week it fell at number thirty-one, and it was last seen in the top forty of the chart on January 2, 2010, at number thirty-three.

== Track listing ==
I Am... Yours: An Intimate Performance at Wynn Las Vegas – Standard edition (DVD/Blu-ray)
No.	Title	Length
1.	"Hello"	3:48
2.	"Halo"	5:33
3.	"Irreplaceable"	5:38
4.	"Sweet Dreams Medley"	9:27
5.	"If I Were a Boy"	5:35
6.	"Scared of Lonely"	4:08
7.	"That's Why You're Beautiful"	3:14
8.	"Satellites"	2:31
9.	"Resentment"	6:02
10.	"Déjà Vu Jazz Medley"	2:05
11.	"Déjà Vu"	2:05
12.	"I Wanna Be Where You Are"	3:24
13.	"Destiny's Child Medley"	11:52
14.	"Work It Out"	3:27
15.	"'03 Bonnie & Clyde"	1:37
16.	"Crazy in Love"	6:55
17.	"Naughty Girl"	2:42
18.	"Get Me Bodied"	2:58
19.	"Single Ladies (Put a Ring on It)"	5:41
20.	"Finale"	2:26
21.	"Credits"
22.	"What Happens in Vegas..."	24:08
Total length:		2:02:27

I Am... Yours: An Intimate Performance at Wynn Las Vegas – Deluxe edition disc one (CD)
No.	Title	Length
1.	"Hello"	3:48
2.	"Halo"	5:33
3.	"Irreplaceable"	5:38
4.	"Sweet Dreams Medley"	9:27
5.	"If I Were a Boy"	5:35
6.	"Scared of Lonely"	4:08
7.	"That's Why You're Beautiful"	3:14
8.	"Satellites"	2:31
9.	"Resentment"	6:02
10.	"Déjà Vu Jazz Medley"	2:05
11.	"Déjà Vu"	2:05
Total length:		48:46

I Am... Yours: An Intimate Performance at Wynn Las Vegas – Deluxe edition disc two (CD)
No.	Title	Length
1.	"I Wanna Be Where You Are"	3:24
2.	"Destiny's Child Medley"	11:52
3.	"Work It Out"	3:27
4.	"'03 Bonnie & Clyde"	1:37
5.	"Crazy in Love"	6:55
6.	"Naughty Girl"	2:42
7.	"Get Me Bodied"	2:58
8.	"Single Ladies (Put a Ring on It)"	5:41
9.	"Finale"	2:26
Total length:		39:02

I Am... Yours: An Intimate Performance at Wynn Las Vegas – Japanese edition (bonus tracks)
No.	Title	Length
10.	"Poison"	4:05
11.	"Video Phone" (Extended Remix) (featuring Lady Gaga)	5:04
Total length:		48:11

I Am... Yours: An Intimate Performance at Wynn Las Vegas – Deluxe edition disc three (DVD)
No.	Title	Length
1.	"Scene One: Hello Introduction"
2.	"Scene Two: Halo"
3.	"Scene Three: Irreplaceable"
4.	"Scene Four: Sweet Dreams Medley"
5.	"Scene Five: If I Were a Boy"
6.	"Scene Six: Scared of Lonely"
7.	"Scene Seven: That's Why You're Beautiful"
8.	"Scene Eight: Satellites"
9.	"Scene Nine: Resentment"
10.	"Déjà Vu Jazz Medley"
11.	"Déjà Vu"
12.	"Tap Sequence"
13.	"Scene One: I Wanna Be Where You Are"
14.	"Scene Two: Destiny's Child"
16.	"Scene Three: Beyoncé"
17.	"Scene Four: Single Ladies (Put a Ring on It)"
18.	"Finale & End Credits"
19.	"What Happens in Vegas..."

Notes

- Credits feature the live instrumental of "Halo".
- "Sweet Dreams Medley" contains excerpts from "Dangerously in Love 2" by Beyoncé and "Sweet Love" by Anita Baker
- "If I Were a Boy" contains elements from "California Love" by 2Pac featuring Dr. Dre and Roger Troutman and “You Oughta Know” by Alanis Morissette
- "Déjà Vu Jazz Medley" contains excerpts from "It Don't Mean a Thing (If It Ain't Got That Swing)" by Duke Ellington and "Bootylicious" by Destiny's Child
- "I Wanna Be Where You Are" contains excerpts from "Welcome to Hollywood" by Beyoncé and Jay-Z and "Hallelujah" from Messiah by George Frideric Handel
- "Destiny's Child Medley" contains excerpts from "No, No, No Part 1", "No, No, No Part 2", "Bug a Boo", "Bills, Bills, Bills", "Say My Name", "Jumpin', Jumpin'", "Independent Women Part I", "Bootylicious" and "Survivor" by Destiny's Child
- "Single Ladies (Put a Ring on It)" contains excerpts from "Electric Feel" by MGMT
- "Finale" contains excerpts from "It Don't Mean a Thing (If It Ain't Got That Swing)" by Duke Ellington and "Ornithology" by The Charles Parker Septet

== Personnel ==
Personnel adapted from AllMusic and album's liner notes.

- Emanuel "Bucket" Baker – mixing assistant
- Beyoncé – A&R, director, executive producer, producer, script
- Braddon Williams – vocal engineer, vocals
- Ed Burke – director, photography
- Kim Burse – creative director, music direction
- Anthony Catalano – Pro Tools
- Guy Charbonneau – audio engineer
- Ian C. Charbonneau – assistant engineer
- Fusako Chubachi – package design
- Tom Coyne – mastering
- Matthew Dickens – script
- Divinity Roxx – musical director
- Paul Foley – Pro Tools
- Frank Gatson Jr. – script
- James Griffiths – assistant vocal engineer
- Angelica Haro – mixing assistant
- Jean-Marie Horvat – mixing
- Ty Hunter – stylist
- Quincy S. Jackson – marketing
- Harold Jones – production manager
- Juli Knapp – A&R
- Mathew Knowles – A&R, executive producer
- Tina Knowles – stylist
- Bibi McGill – musical director
- Emer Patten – producer
- Sheira Rees-Davies – executive producer
- Kevin "Kwiz" Ryan – Pro Tools
- Raquel Smith – stylistic assistant
- Ryan Smith – mastering
- Rie Tsuji – musical director
- Timothy White – stylist

== Charts ==
=== Weekly charts ===
Chart (2009–10)	Peak position
Australian Music DVD (ARIA)	11
Australian Urban Albums (ARIA)	11
Belgian Albums (Ultratop Wallonia)	90
Belgian Music DVD (Ultratop Flanders)	9
Brazilian Albums (PMB)	1
Czech Albums (ČNS IFPI)	2
Czech Music DVD (ČNS IFPI)	1
Dutch Albums (MegaCharts)	66
Dutch Music DVD (MegaCharts)	4
French Albums (SNEP)	117
German Albums (Offizielle Top 100)	85
German Music DVD (GfK Entertainment Charts)	16
Greek Albums (IFPI)	23
Japanese Albums (Oricon)	43
Mexican Albums (Top 100 Mexico)	58
New Zealand Music DVD (RMNZ)	6
Portuguese Albums (AFP)	18
South Korean International Albums (Gaon)	16
Spanish Albums (PROMUSICAE)	8
Spanish Music DVD (PROMUSICAE)	7
Swedish Music DVD (Sverigetopplistan)	10
UK Music Video (OCC)	47
UK R&B Albums (OCC)	24
US Music Video (Billboard)	1

=== Year-end charts ===
Chart (2010)	Position
Australian Music DVD (ARIA)	44
Australian Urban Albums (ARIA)	40
Dutch Music DVD (MegaCharts)	30
US Music Video (Billboard)	1

== Certifications ==
Region	Certification	Certified units/sales
Australia (ARIA)	Platinum	15,000^{^}
United States (RIAA)	2× Platinum	200,000^{^}
^{^} Shipments figures based on certification alone.

== Release history ==
Release dates and formats for I Am... Yours: An Intimate Performance at Wynn Las Vegas
Region	Date	Edition(s)	Format(s)	Label(s)	Ref.
Australia	November 20, 2009	Standard; deluxe	DVD; double CD+DVD	Sony Music	
France	November 20, 2009	Deluxe	Double CD+DVD	Columbia	
Germany	November 20, 2009	Deluxe	Double CD+DVD	Sony Music	
Netherlands	November 20, 2009	Standard	DVD	Sony Music	
France	November 23, 2009	Standard	DVD	Sony Music	
United States	November 23, 2009	Standard; deluxe	DVD; double CD+DVD	Columbia; Music World	
Japan	December 2, 2009	Standard	Double CD+DVD	Sony Music Japan	
United Kingdom	December 7, 2009	Deluxe	Double CD+DVD	RCA	
Germany	December 11, 2009	Standard	Blu-ray	Sony Music	
Poland	December 14, 2009	Standard	Blu-ray	Sony Music	
Canada	December 15, 2009	Standard	Blu-ray	Sony Music	
France	December 15, 2009	Standard	Blu-ray	Sony Music	
United States	December 15, 2009	Standard	Blu-ray	Columbia; Music World	
Thailand	December 22, 2009	Standard	DVD	Sony Music	
China	September 10, 2010	Standard	Double CD; DVD	Sony Music	
United States	September 28, 2010	Instrumental	Digital download	Columbia; Music World	

== See also ==
- I Am... Yours
