= I Am... World Tour (album) =

2010 live video album by Beyoncé

- Standard edition cover

Live album / video by Beyoncé
- Released: November 26, 2010
- Recorded: 2009–2010
- Venues: The O2 Arena (London); Various venues in the United States, Europe, Asia and South America
- Genres: Pop; soul; R&B
- Length: 1:34:56
- Labels: Parkwood; Music World; Columbia
- Directors: Beyoncé Knowles; Ed Burke; Frank Gatson Jr.
- Producers: Beyoncé Knowles; Camille Yorrick

Beyoncé chronology
I Am... Yours: An Intimate Performance at Wynn Las Vegas (2009)	I Am... World Tour (2010)	Heat (2011)

Beyoncé video chronology
I Am... Yours: An Intimate Performance at Wynn Las Vegas (2009)	I Am... World Tour (2010)	Live at Roseland: Elements of 4 (2011)

Alternative cover
- Deluxe edition / live album cover

I Am... World Tour is the fourth live album and the fifth video by American singer Beyoncé. It was released on November 26, 2010 by Parkwood Entertainment, Music World Entertainment and Columbia Records.

Beyoncé produced, directed and edited the I Am... World Tour concert film for her own production company Parkwood Pictures. It was filmed in the presence of more than a million fans during her worldwide I Am... World Tour, running from March 2009 through February 2010, in support of her third studio album, I Am... Sasha Fierce (2008). The DVD on the album is a combination of performances from the tour, including guest appearances from Jay-Z and Kanye West, as well as backstage moments. Beyoncé explained that the idea of filming her worldwide performances came when she realized that she was feeling lonely. She edited the film for nine months and it serves as her directorial debut.

I Am... World Tour was released in three separate editions – standard, deluxe and Blu-ray. In the United States, the standard edition was made available exclusively at Walmart on November 26, 2010. The deluxe edition was released in several countries around the world on the same date. The Blu-ray edition was released from December 3, 2010 in a list of selected countries only. Beyoncé promoted the album by appearing on several shows, including ABC's Nightline and by holding a screening of the film in New York City, in presence of several fans and artists on November 21, 2010. Prior to the release, numerous trailers were posted on Beyoncé's official website. I Am... World Tour premiered exclusively on ABC on November 25, 2010 as a ninety-minute Thanksgiving special.

Upon the release of I Am... World Tour, it received mixed to positive reviews from music critics who generally praised the high-energy performances of the songs as well as Beyoncé's vocals. I Am... World Tour debuted at number one on the US Top Music Videos, giving Beyoncé her second consecutive and third non-consecutive number-one DVD in the United States. It was certified double platinum by the Recording Industry Association of America (RIAA). The album was also successful worldwide, peaking within the top ten on the DVD charts in every country after its release. It became the best-selling video album worldwide of 2010 and seventh of 2011. I Am... World Tour was nominated for a Grammy Award for Best Long Form Music Video at the 54th Annual Grammy Awards (2012).

== Background ==
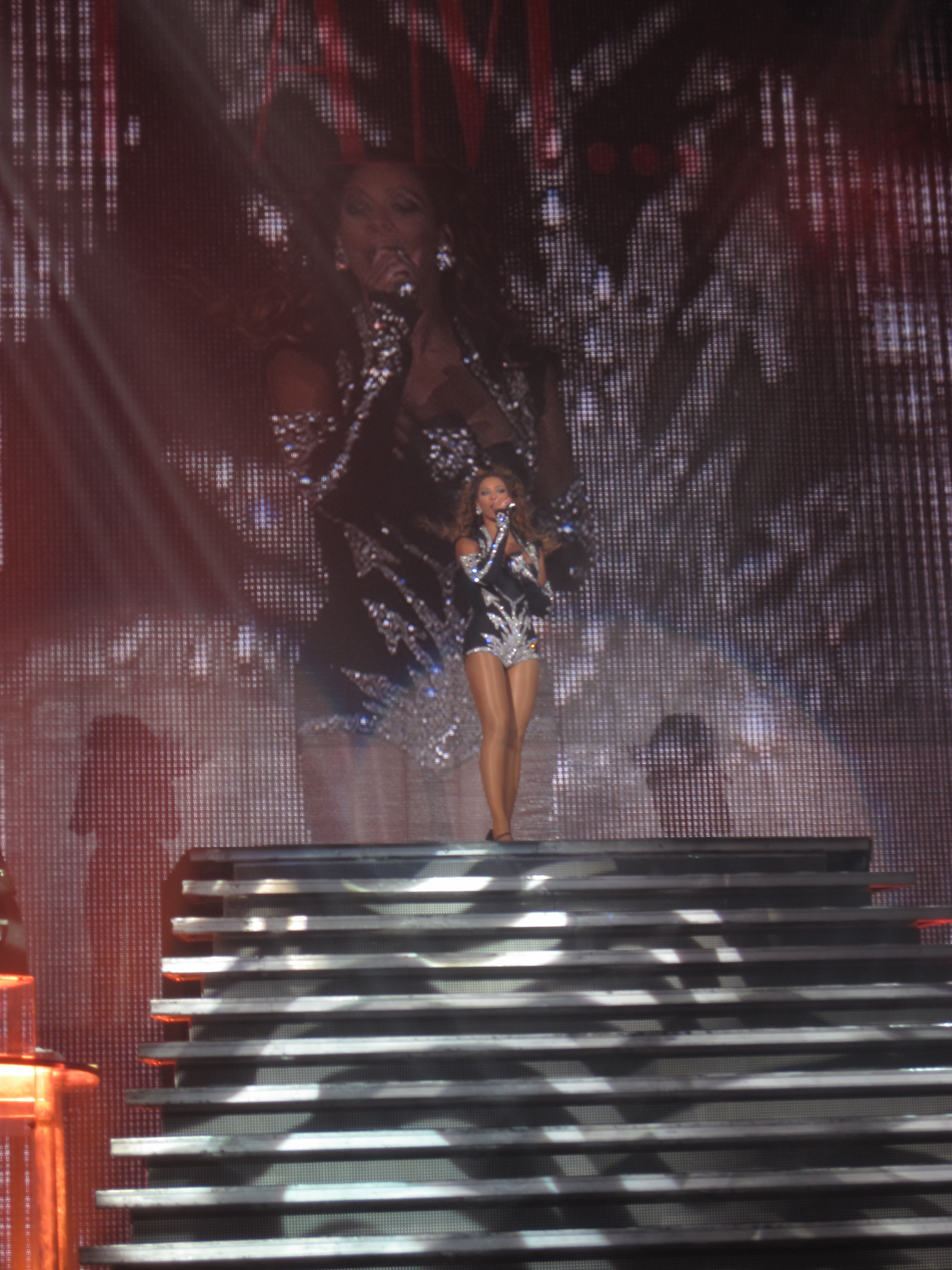
Beyoncé performing "Halo" at the O2 Arena, in London, England during her I Am... World Tour

To promote I Am... Sasha Fierce, Beyoncé embarked on the I Am... World Tour with several performances. The tour kicked off in Edmonton, Alberta, Canada on March 26, 2009, in support of the album. The European leg of the tour started on April 26, 2009, in Zagreb, Croatia and ended on June 9, 2009, in London, England. On June 21, 2009, she began the third leg of the tour in the United States and finished in August with a four-day stint at Encore Las Vegas on the Las Vegas Strip. Starting on September 15, 2009, the fourth leg began in Melbourne, Australia and finished on September 24 in Perth, Australia. Beyoncé then went on performing in Asia, the Middle East, Europe, Africa, and the United Kingdom, before finishing the 2009 portion of the tour on November 24 in Belfast, Northern Ireland. The tour had its final leg in 2010, visiting Latin America. Starting on February 4, 2010, in Florianópolis, Brazil, she visited five other places before ending in Trinidad on February 18, 2010. According to Pollstar, the tour earned $17.2 million between January 1, and June 30, 2010, which added onto her total of $86 million for her first ninety-three concerts in 2009, bringing the tour total to $103.2 million for the ninety-seven shows.

While Beyoncé was on tour, she performed at a Las Vegas residency at the Encore Theatre in Las Vegas. Titled I Am... Yours, and the August 2, 2009 show was recorded and later released as a DVD, audio CD and television special in late November 2009, titled I Am... Yours: An Intimate Performance at Wynn Las Vegas.

== Production and filming ==
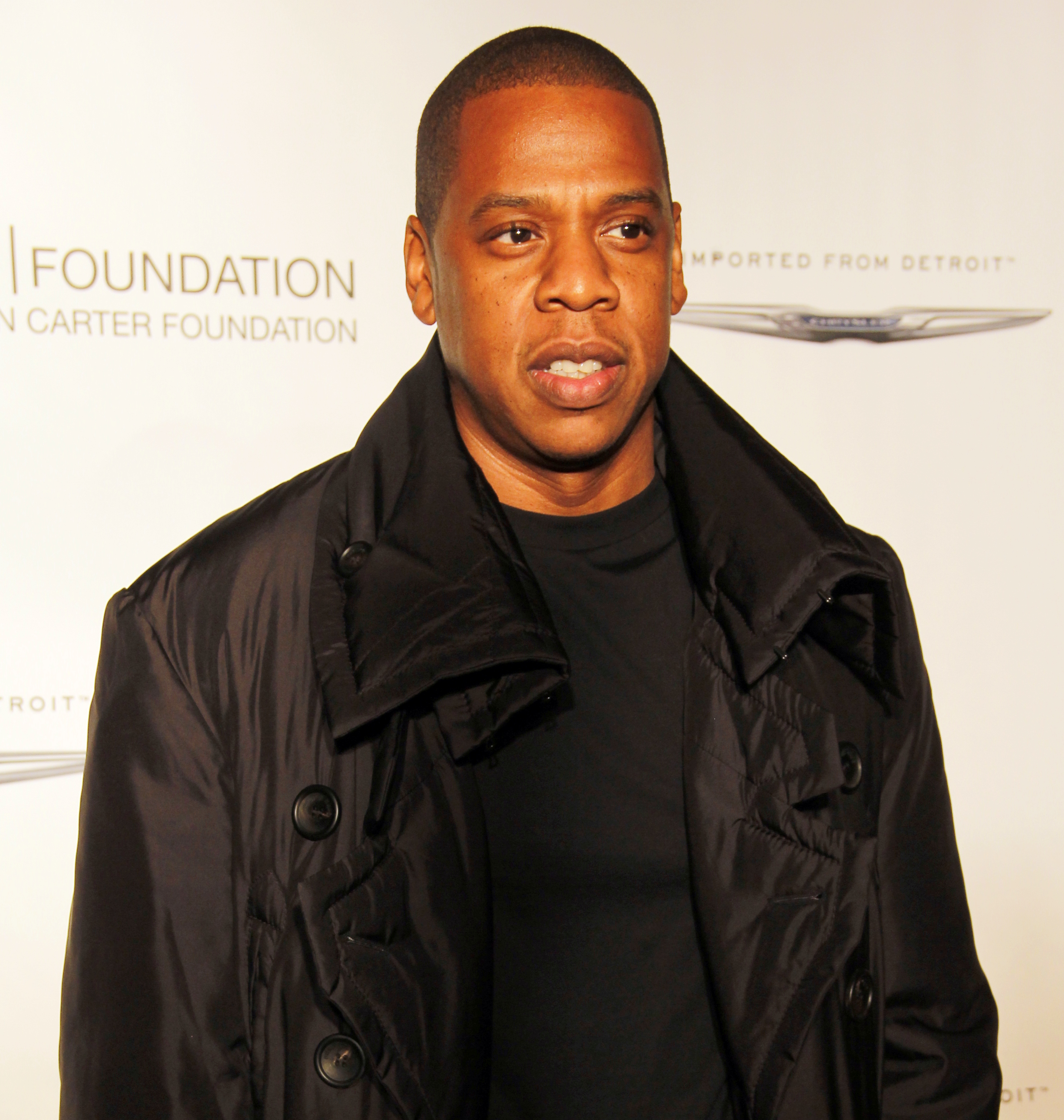
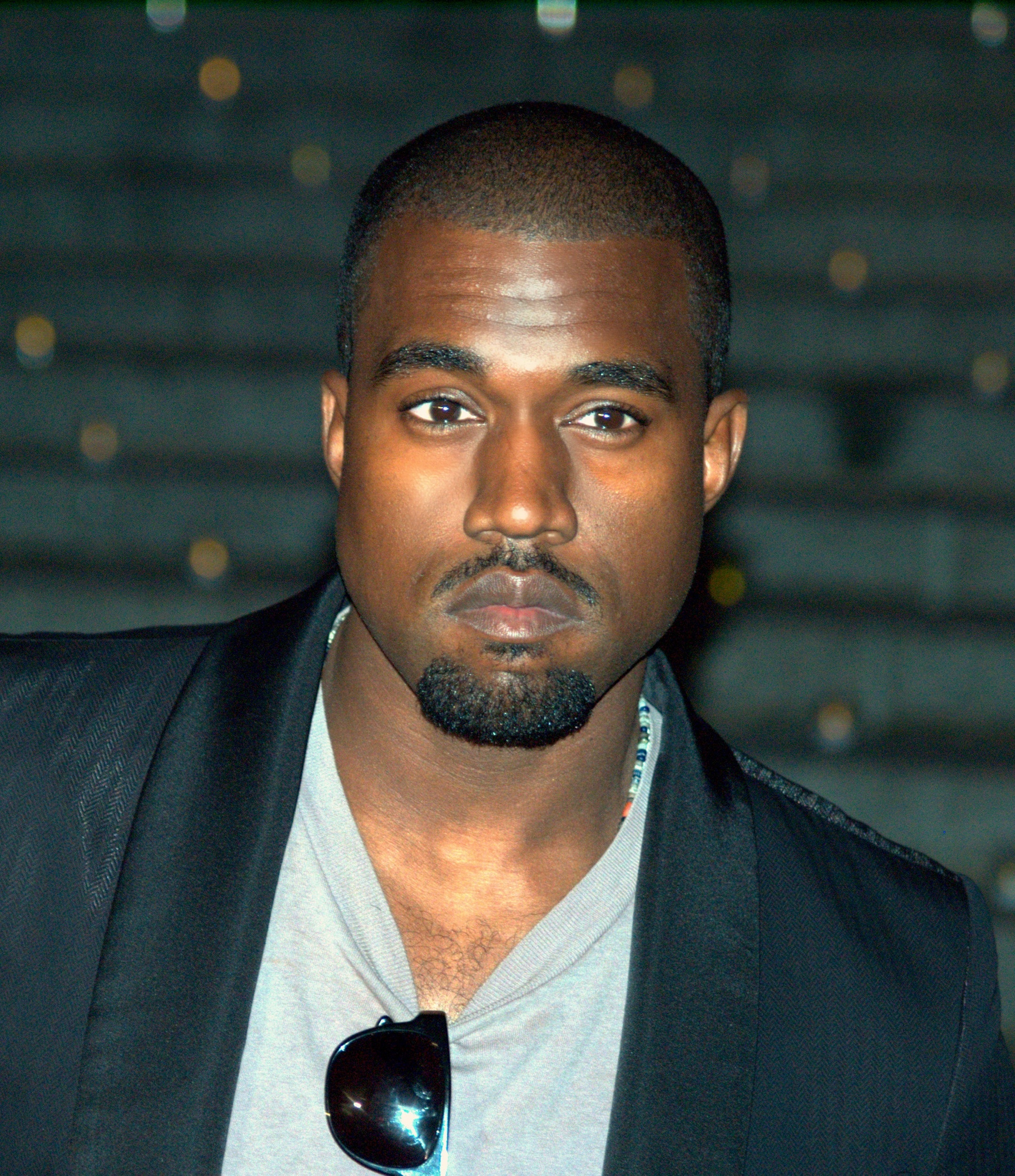
Jay-Z (left) and Kanye West (right) make special appearances during the film.

I Am... World Tour was produced, directed and edited by Beyoncé for her own production company Parkwood Pictures. It contains tour footage from one-hundred-and-eight shows that took place in seventy-eight cities, thirty-two countries, and six continents in the presence of 1.1 million fans around the world. The show is a combination of performance clips from the tour, as well as backstage moments. I Am... World Tour also serves as the directorial debut for Beyoncé. On this occasion, she confessed that it was a lot of work for her, nevertheless, she was very happy and eager for her fans to see her film directed by herself. She explained: "I'm so excited – this is my directorial debut. I am just thrilled that my fans are going to be in the theatre with me and I can't wait for everyone to see it. It took me nine months to edit because I wanted to show a little bit of each show, each performance on tour, and it was 116 shows, so you can only imagine how much work it was, [but] it was worth it."

At the New York City screening of the film, Beyoncé further explained that she was completely "hands-on", deciding which moments made the final cut and which ones wound up on the cutting-room floor, stating: "It was hard work. I learned so much. I have a new respect for directors and I think I would like to do more of it." Some of the behind-the-scenes footage was shot by Beyoncé on her laptop. The DVD captures concert footage from cities in Europe, Asia, South America, and the United States, all edited into one concert. However, I Am... World Tour was significantly recorded at London's larger the O2 Arena, a few months after the I Am... Yours concert. A live CD of the concert, a behind-the-scenes documentary of her life along the tour and a twenty-page book of exclusive photos are all included in the package. According to a press release, "it is meant to create the ne plus ultra Knowles concert experience, seen from her perspective".

== Film synopsis ==
"When you work that hard, you just need someone to say stop. You know? Your voice is a muscle and it needs rest, and imagine nine days... I was just delirious and feeling sorry and bad and I was like, you know, 'I need rest.' ... And in the end, I cried because clearly I'm a human being and I bleed and I hurt and I cry and I fall just like anybody else."

— Beyoncé, Nightline

In addition to offering behind-the-scenes glimpses into Beyoncé's intimate world on tour, the film also features performances of over twenty songs with staging, choreography, lighting and production values. In between performances of "If I Were a Boy", which included a medley with Alanis Morissette's "You Oughta Know", viewers get glimpses of her childhood from old video footage. The footage transitions from Beyoncé dancing up a storm in her childhood home, to sleepless nights on tour where she worries about her health after nine consecutive days of touring, rehearsing, and recording. Despite her struggles, she sings Destiny's Child songs, "Bootylicious" and "Survivor", and asks for a guest appearance from Kanye West. For "Single Ladies (Put a Ring on It)", Beyoncé's performance is accompanied by YouTube footage of fans mimicking her moves, and a short video clip of then-President of the United States Barack Obama.

In some of the raw moments captured in the documentary, Beyoncé appears completely bare. During one video, Beyoncé cries and asks herself: "Why did God give me this life? Sometimes it's overwhelming. Why did God give me my talent, my gift, my family. But I know you're not supposed to question God." She told Entertainment Tonight: "I wanted to do something a little different with the film ... I wanted people to re-experience the show in a different way. Everyone that had been to the show – I wanted them to see things that they didn't get to see. I figured it would be cool for everyone to see it from my point of view. It's a peek behind the curtain ... honestly, more than no makeup, the emotions and just being so real and raw, I don't think I'd be able to let down my guard the way I did if anybody was in the room." The last minutes of the film get very sentimental, with a performance of Etta James's classic "At Last" set to the backdrop of Civil Rights-era footage, followed by a close-up moment when Beyoncé admits that her life can be overwhelming, although she is blessed, stating, "I'm grateful... I'm alive and I'm living my dreams." The film's final performance shows Beyoncé performing "Halo" and sees her paying tribute to Michael Jackson. She also splices in footage of an old video from the night she attended her first Michael Jackson concert as a child. At the end of the performance, the whole production wraps as Beyoncé throws up the Roc sign and exits the stage.

== Release and promotion ==
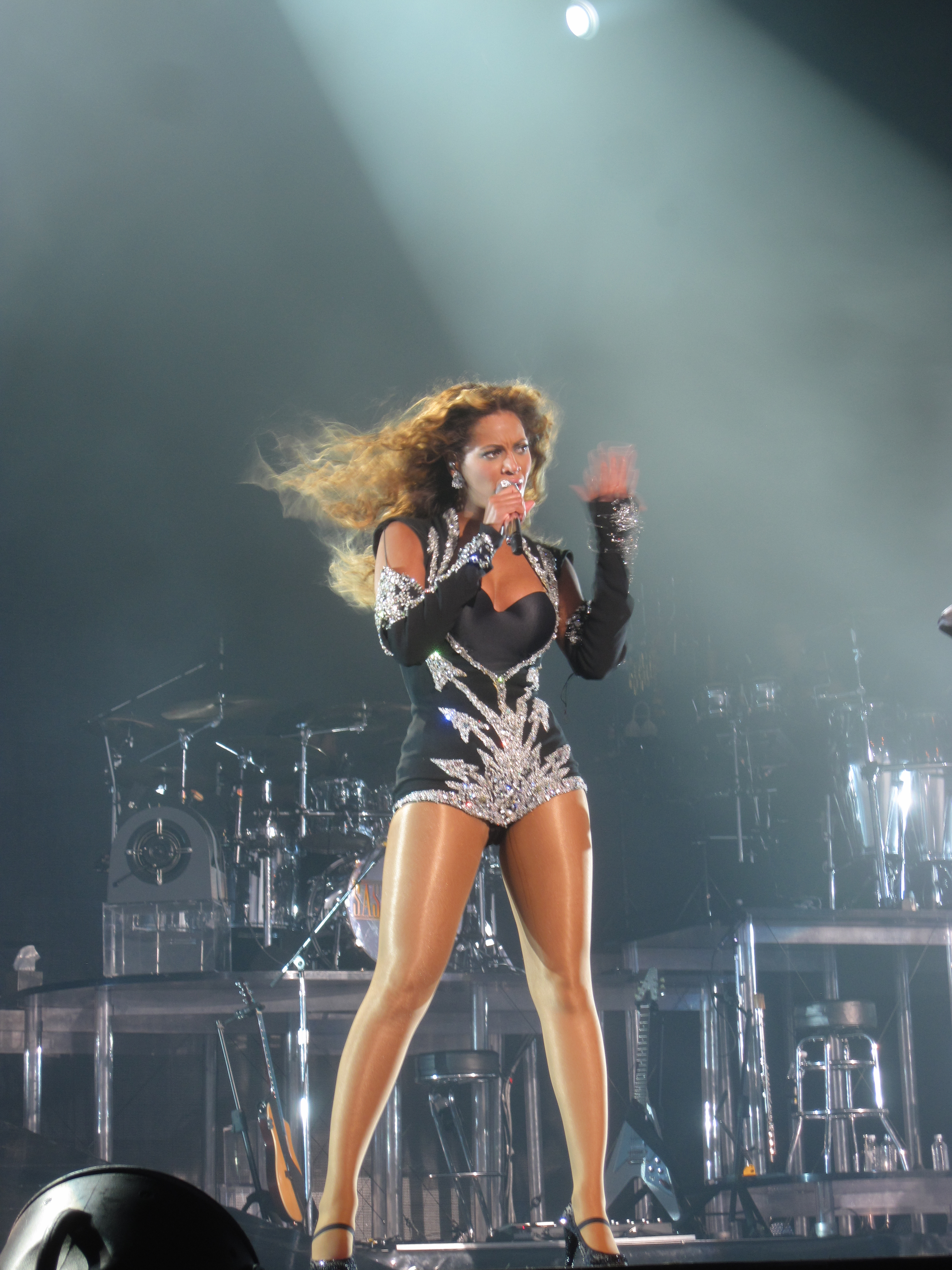
Beyoncé performing "Single Ladies (Put a Ring on It)" on her I Am... World Tour

After Beyoncé finished her concert at the Trent FM Arena in Nottingham, England on November 20, 2009, she announced to the crowd that a new album would be released the next year. I Am... World Tour features performances from Beyoncé's tour. She explained that the idea of filming her worldwide performances came when she realized that she was feeling lonely, stating "there was one moment I was in China and I was in this huge suite and I looked out the window and there were just thousands of people walking and I couldn't believe my life... I guess I was a bit lonely and I wanted to talk to someone so I opened up my computer and I just talked." Additionally, Beyoncé revealed that the DVD will show more of her intimate side. Both Jay-Z and Kanye West make guest appearances on the film.

In November 2010, there was a sweepstakes to win tickets to an exclusive screening of the film. A thirty-four-second promo trailer of I Am... World Tour was launched on several websites in early November 2010. The album's track listing was confirmed on November 12, 2010. Several other trailers kept dropping on Beyoncé's official website during November. Beyoncé made an appearance at the School of Visual Arts Theater in Chelsea, Manhattan on November 21, 2010 to premiere the film. On November 22, 2010, she held a screening of the film in New York City, in presence of her parents and artists such as Mary J. Blige, Jennifer Hudson, Amel Larrieux, Tyson Beckford, Alicia Keys, and AJ Calloway. Additionally, in an interview with the Associated Press on the same day, Beyoncé revealed that the DVD will show more of her intimate side, stating: "I felt like I've done so many different things, it's time for me to show a bit of who I am. The hardest thing was showing that, because a lot of things that I filmed, I filmed in my computer, and I would never have gotten so open if someone else was in the room." The same day, Rolling Stone organized a competition where I Am... World Tour was one of the gifts for readers of the magazine. On November 23, 2010, Beyoncé was interviewed by Cynthia McFadden on ABC's Nightline where she stated: "I feel like I wanted the fans to be able to see the things that I see... It's a lot of things that I reveal about myself that I would never give to another director."

The concert film premiered exclusively on ABC on November 25, 2010 as a ninety-minute Thanksgiving special. A year before, over Thanksgiving itself, the network aired I Am... Yours: An Intimate Performance at Wynn Las Vegas, shot at the Encore Theater, Las Vegas, on August 2, 2009.

In the United States, the standard edition of the album was released exclusively at Walmart stores on November 26, 2010. The deluxe edition of I Am... World Tour includes the concert DVD, a live audio CD, an exclusive documentary, and a forty-page four-color booklet of never before seen photos of her journey around the world, and was made available on November 30, 2010 in several countries. The Blu-ray edition was released on December 7, 2010. A live instrumentals album was released digitally on February 1, 2011 and on double-sided vinyl on February 22. This is Beyoncé's third release of this nature but the first live instrumental album to have a physical release; the live instrumentals album from The Beyoncé Experience Live and I Am... Yours: An Intimate Performance at Wynn Las Vegas were her first two, only released digitally.

On December 1, 2010, Entertainment Weekly offered a six-foot tall version of the poster signed by Beyoncé to one of the first ten people who posted a qualifying comment on the related post on their Facebook wall concerning the giveaway of the first ten copies of I Am... World Tour. On December 8, 2010, Perthnow collaborated with Beyoncé's official website for a competition where twenty copies of the album were available. Fans completed an entry form and signed up to receive one of the copies.

== Critical reception ==
Professional ratings
Review scores
Source	Rating
AllMusic	3/5 stars
Daily Express	4/5 stars
Jam!	4/5 stars
The Independent	2/5 stars
The New York Times	(favorable)
Us Weekly	3/4 stars

Andy Kellman of AllMusic awarded I Am... World Tour three out of five stars and stated: "for anyone but the most devout fans of Beyoncé, this will be overkill, and it doesn't have as much of the playfulness such as the pleasing diversions as the I Am... Yours: An Intimate Performance at Wynn Las Vegas set." Simon Gage of Daily Express awarded it four out of five stars, complimenting Beyoncé's dance moves and praising her vocal capabilities, going on saying that she is "probably the most electric performer since Tina Turner" and calling her the "Queen of R&B". She also praised the quality of the songs "Crazy in Love", "Single Ladies (Put a Ring on It)" and "Halo". Ian Drew of Us Weekly complimented the "high-energy performances" of Beyoncé on the songs by Destiny's Child and enjoyed the black-and-white behind-the-scenes footage. He also added that the singer is "most revelatory when tearing up over [her] missing husband Jay-Z on the road." New York's Amy Odell described the DVD as a "cinematic masterpiece". Jam!'s Darryl Sterdan gave the album a rating of three-and-a-half stars out of five and said: "More than two hours of powerhouse vocal performances and high-energy choreography, accompanied by endless costume changes, eye-popping production and general fabulousness. You'll get tired just watching it." Scott Kara of The New Zealand Herald awarded it three out of five stars, stating that the good thing about the album is that it has a "wider range of songs", nevertheless they do not have the same "rump-rattling power" of the songs in The Beyoncé Experience simply because some songs are too short in duration, "Bootylicious" for instance.

Brad Wete of Entertainment Weekly wrote that, although Beyoncé showed an emotional side of herself during the DVD, "Still, the shows go on in their high-heeled, wonderfully choreographed glory." Jon Pareles of The New York Times compared the DVD with Taylor Swift's Journey to Fearless which aired as a special the same day as I Am... World Tour. He noted: "Beyoncé's I Am... World Tour placed her before much larger audiences, documenting her choreographed razzle-dazzle as she played arenas and stadiums in 2009–10." He further said: "Beyoncé didn't explain: she performed. With costumes that made her a comic-book heroine, a cyborg, a club hottie, and a white-clad vision of purity, she worked her big stages with hip-pumping moves and a soul diva's voice, from creamy to raspy. The documentary quietly flaunted her consistency as a trouper in montages that segued multiple shows — supertitled in small type — with Beyoncé in the same outfit making the same moves, while the fans' nationalities changed around her. Yet for all her superhuman pep, she also came across as warmer than Ms. Swift. She grinned knowingly after belting a phrase into the bleachers, and she drew listeners into her own pop generalities. Andy Gill of The Independent was much less impressed with the DVD, qualifying it as an "unsatisfying, incoherent entertainment experience" even though she liked the way "the visual spectacle put everything in perspective".

== Accolades ==
The concert film received a nomination for NAACP Image Award for Outstanding Variety – Series or Special at the 42nd NAACP Image Awards (2011). I Am... World Tour was nominated for a Grammy Award in the category for Best Long Form Music Video at the 54th Annual Grammy Awards, held on February 12, 2012.

== Commercial performance ==
I Am... World Tour debuted at number one on the Top Music Videos in November 2010. It sold 37,000 copies in its first week and 31,000 copies in its second week of release in the United States. It spent nine non-consecutive weeks at number one in its fifteen weeks of charting. By December 26, 2010, I Am... World Tour had sold 139,000 copies in the United States. I Am... World Tour became the best-selling music DVD of 2010 and the third best-selling DVD of 2011 in the United States. The album also debuted and peaked at number forty on the US Top R&B/Hip-Hop Albums on the issue dated December 18, 2010. According to Nielsen SoundScan, I Am... World Tour has shipped over 200,000 copies in the United States, being certified double platinum by the Recording Industry Association of America (RIAA).

The album also topped the Brazilian Music DVD Chart. On the chart issue dated December 2, 2010, I Am... World Tour debuted and peaked at number four on the Irish Music DVD Chart. On December 11, 2010, the I Am... World Tour debuted at number six on the UK Music Videos. It descended the chart for the next three weeks, before peaking at number five on January 8, 2011. It stayed on that position for three consecutive weeks. It last appeared in the top forty of the chart on May 21, 2011 at number thirty-eight. It also peaked at number thirty-seven on the UK R&B Albums on July 9, 2011. On the chart issue dated December 4, 2010, I Am... World Tour debuted atop the Dutch Music DVD Chart. It remained at the top the following week, and fell to number three on December 18, 2010. I Am... World Tour peaked at number six on the Flemish Music DVD Chart for the chart issue dated December 4, 2010. On December 11, 2010, it peaked at number ten on the Walloon Music DVD Chart. For the week ending December 6, 2010, the album debuted and peaked at number nine on the French Music DVD Chart. I Am... World Tour entered the top twenty on the DVD charts in Czech Republic and Italy, peaking at numbers sixteen and eleven, respectively. In 2011, the DVD was certified gold by the Polish Society of the Phonographic Industry (ZPAV).

On December 6, 2010, I Am... World Tour debuted at number six on the Australian Music DVD Chart, with more than 7,500 copies sold in the first week and hence achieved a gold certification on the same date. It was later certified platinum by the Australian Recording Industry Association (ARIA) for selling 15,000 copies. It was the fortieth best-selling DVD in Australia in 2010 and 2011. On the New Zealand Music DVD Chart, I Am... World Tour debuted at number five for the chart issue dated May 30, 2011, peaking at number four the following week. In 2010, I Am... World Tour became the best-selling music DVD in the world. The next year, it was the seventh best-selling DVD worldwide.

== Track listing ==
I Am... World Tour – Standard edition (DVD)
No.	Title	Length
1.	"Intro"	1:54
2.	"Crazy in Love" (featuring Jay-Z)	5:24
3.	"Naughty Girl"	2:34
4.	"Tomorrow I Am... Sasha Fierce"	0:40
5.	"Freakum Dress"	2:47
6.	"Get Me Bodied"	2:59
7.	"Smash into You"	3:50
8.	"Ave Maria"	4:17
9.	"Broken-Hearted Girl"	3:46
10.	"If I Were a Boy" / "You Oughta Know"	5:48
11.	"Robot"	0:59
12.	"Diva"	2:52
13.	"Radio"	2:36
14.	"Socks & Stilettos"	0:15
15.	"Ego" (featuring Kanye West)	3:30
16.	"Hello"	3:39
17.	"Sasha vs. Beyoncé"	0:54
18.	"Baby Boy" / "You Don't Love Me, No No No"	4:27
19.	"Irreplaceable"	6:02
20.	"Check on It"	2:14
21.	"Bootylicious"	0:41
22.	"Upgrade U"	2:21
23.	"Video Phone"	2:30
24.	"Are You Filming Me with That?"	1:02
25.	"Say My Name"	2:21
26.	"At Last"	3:53
27.	"Listen"	3:24
28.	"Single Ladies Contest"	1:38
29.	"Single Ladies (Put a Ring on It)"	4:20
30.	"Halo"	11:44
31.	"Credits"	3:56
Total length:		1:34:56

I Am... World Tour – Deluxe edition (bonus video)
No.	Title	Length
32.	"Mic and a Light" (Documentary)	23:22
Total length:		1:55:18

I Am... World Tour – Deluxe edition (bonus CD)
No.	Title	Length
1.	"Intro"	1:12
2.	"Crazy in Love" (featuring Jay-Z)	5:24
3.	"Naughty Girl"	2:34
4.	"Freakum Dress"	3:11
5.	"Get Me Bodied"	2:30
6.	"Smash into You"	3:52
7.	"Ave Maria"	4:16
8.	"Broken-Hearted Girl"	3:13
9.	"If I Were a Boy" / "You Oughta Know"	5:17
10.	"Diva"	3:00
11.	"Radio"	2:04
12.	"Ego" (featuring Kanye West)	1:55
13.	"Hello"	3:38
14.	"Baby Boy"	2:10
15.	"You Don't Love Me, No No No"	1:49
16.	"Irreplaceable"	5:04
17.	"Check on It"	2:09
18.	"Bootylicious"	0:50
19.	"Upgrade U"	2:16
20.	"Say My Name"	2:20
21.	"At Last"	3:00
22.	"Listen"	3:22
23.	"Single Ladies (Put a Ring on It)"	4:23
24.	"Halo"	6:32
25.	"Outro"	1:59
Total length:		74:00

Notes

- End credits of "Mic and a Light" feature "That's Why You're Beautiful" by Beyoncé

Sample credits

- "Crazy in Love" contains samples from "Déjà Vu" by Beyoncé featuring Jay-Z, "Are You My Woman? (Tell Me So)" by The Chi-Lites, "I Just Wanna Love U (Give It 2 Me)" by Jay-Z, "Let Me Clear My Throat" by DJ Kool, and "Pass the Peas" by The J.B.'s
- "Naughty Girl" contains interpolations from "Love to Love You Baby" by Donna Summer
- "Ave Maria" contains samples from "Carol of the Bells" by Mykola Leontovych and "Ave Maria" by Franz Schubert
- "If I Were a Boy"/"You Oughta Know" contains a sample from "California Love" by 2Pac featuring Dr. Dre and Roger Troutman
- "Robot" contains a sample from "Sweet Dreams" by Beyoncé
- "Diva" contains a sample from "Hovi Baby" by Jay-Z
- "Sasha vs. Beyoncé" contains samples from "Coming to America" by The System and "The King's Motorcade" by Nile Rodgers
- "Bootylicious" contains a sample from "Edge of Seventeen" by Stevie Nicks
- "Upgrade U" contains a sample from "Girls Can't Do What the Guys Do" by Betty Wright
- "Video Phone" contains a sample from "Suga Mama" by Beyoncé
- "At Last" contains a sample from "Survivor" by Destiny's Child
- "Single Ladies (Put a Ring on It)" contains a sample from "You Make Me Wanna Shout" by Doug E. Fresh
- "Credits" contains samples from "Satellites" and "Sweet Dreams" by Beyoncé

== Personnel ==
Credits are taken from the album's liner notes.

- Executive producer – Beyoncé
- director – Beyoncé, Frank Gatson Jr.
- Editor – Beyoncé
- Photography – Ed Burke
- Producer – Camille Yorrick
- Engineering support – Jordan "DJ Swivel" Young
- Vocals – Beyoncé
- Contributing artists – Jay-Z, Kanye West
- Marketing - Quincy S. Jackson

== Charts ==
=== Weekly charts ===
Chart (2010–11)	Peak position
Australian Music DVD (ARIA)	2
Belgian Music DVD (Ultratop Flanders)	6
Belgian Music DVD (Ultratop Wallonia)	10
Brazilian Music DVD (PMB)	1
Czech Music DVD (ČNS IFPI)	16
Dutch Music DVD (MegaCharts)	1
French Music DVD (SNEP)	9
Irish Music DVD (IRMA)	4
Italian Albums (FIMI)	63
Italian Music DVD (FIMI)	5
Japanese Albums (Oricon)	76
Mexican Albums (Top 100 Mexico)	89
New Zealand Music DVD (RMNZ)	4
Norwegian Music DVD (VG-lista)	7
Portuguese Albums (AFP)	8
South Korean International Albums (Gaon)	3
Spanish Albums (PROMUSICAE)	15
Swedish Music DVD (Sverigetopplistan)	7
Swiss Music DVD (Schweizer Hitparade)	6
UK Music Videos (Official Charts)	5
UK R&B Albums (Official Charts)	37
US Music Videos (Billboard)	1
US Top R&B/Hip-Hop Albums (Billboard)	40

=== Monthly charts ===
Chart (2010)	Peak position
Argentine Music DVD (CAPIF)	8

=== Year-end charts ===
Chart (2010)	Position
Australian Music DVD (ARIA)	40
Dutch Music DVD (MegaCharts)	22
US Music Videos (Billboard)	1

Chart (2011)	Position
Australian Music DVD (ARIA)	40
Belgian Music DVD (Ultratop Flanders)	16
Dutch Music DVD (MegaCharts)	10
US Music Videos (Billboard)	3

Chart (2016)	Position
Belgian Music DVD (Ultratop Flanders)	49

== Certifications ==
Certifications for I Am... World Tour (album)
Region	Certification	Certified units/sales
Brazil (Pro-Música Brasil)	Gold	20,000^{‡}
^{‡} Sales+streaming figures based on certification alone.

Certifications for I Am... World Tour (video)
Region	Certification	Certified units/sales
Australia (ARIA)	Platinum	15,000^{^}
Poland (ZPAV)	Gold	5,000^{*}
United Kingdom (BPI)	Platinum	50,000^{*}
United States (RIAA)	2× Platinum	200,000^{^}
^{*} Sales figures based on certification alone.^{^} Shipments figures based on certification alone.

== Release history ==
Release dates and formats for I Am... World Tour
Region	Date	Edition(s)	Format(s)	Label(s)	Ref.
Australia	November 26, 2010	Standard	DVD	Sony Music	
Brazil	November 26, 2010	Deluxe	CD+DVD	Sony Music	
Croatia	November 26, 2010	Deluxe	CD+DVD	Menart	
Germany	November 26, 2010	Standard; deluxe	Digital download; DVD; CD+DVD	Sony Music	
United States	November 26, 2010	Standard	DVD (Walmart exclusive)	Parkwood; Columbia; Music World	
Poland	November 29, 2010	Standard; deluxe	DVD; CD+DVD	Sony Music	
United Kingdom	November 29, 2010	Standard	DVD	RCA	
Canada	November 30, 2010	Deluxe	CD+DVD	Sony Music	
France	November 30, 2010	Deluxe	CD+DVD	Columbia	
United States	November 30, 2010	Deluxe	CD+DVD	Parkwood; Columbia; Music World	
Australia	December 3, 2010	Standard	Blu-ray	Sony Music	
Croatia	December 3, 2010	Standard	Blu-ray	Sony Music	
Germany	December 3, 2010	Standard	Blu-ray	Sony Music	
Netherlands	December 3, 2010	Standard	Blu-ray	Sony Music	
France	December 6, 2010	Standard	Blu-ray; DVD	Sony Music	
Poland	December 6, 2010	Standard	Blu-ray	Sony Music	
Canada	December 7, 2010	Standard	Blu-ray	Sony Music	
United States	December 7, 2010	Standard	Blu-ray	Parkwood; Columbia; Music World	
Japan	December 22, 2010	Deluxe	CD+DVD	Sony Music Japan	
United States	February 1, 2011	Instrumental	Digital download	Parkwood; Columbia; Music World	

== See also ==
- I Am... World Tour
