= Get Me Bodied =

2007 single by Beyoncé

Single by Beyoncé

from the album B'Day
- Released: July 10, 2007
- Recorded: April 2006
- Studio: Sony Music Studios (New York City, New York)
- Genre: Bounce; R&B
- Length: 3:25 (album version); 4:00 (radio edit); 6:18 (extended mix)
- Label: Columbia; Music World
- Composer: Kasseem Dean
- Lyricists: Beyoncé Knowles; Sean Garrett; Makeba Riddick; Angela Beyincé; Solange Knowles
- Producers: Beyoncé Knowles; Swizz Beatz; Sean Garrett

Beyoncé singles chronology
| "Beautiful Liar" (2007) | "Get Me Bodied" (2007) | "Green Light" (2007) |

Music videos
- "Get Me Bodied" (extended mix) on YouTube; "Get Me Bodied" (Timbaland remix) on YouTube

"Get Me Bodied" is a song recorded by American singer Beyoncé for her second solo studio album B'Day (2006). The song was written by Beyoncé, Kasseem "Swizz Beatz" Dean, Sean Garrett, Makeba Riddick, Angela Beyincé, and Solange Knowles, with production handled by Dean, Beyoncé and Garrett. Inspired by her sister Solange and former Destiny's Child groupmates Kelly Rowland and Michelle Williams, Beyonce co-wrote the song as a tribute to their shared experiences. Columbia Records and Music World Entertainment released "Get Me Bodied" as the album's fifth single in the United States on July 10, 2007.

The song blends R&B and bounce with influences from dancehall and reggae. Its lyrics portray a confident woman preparing for a night out, dressed to impress and commanding attention on the dance floor. "Get Me Bodied" received positive reviews from music critics, who praised its energetic production and Beyonce's dynamic vocals. The American Society of Composers, Authors and Publishers (ASCAP) named it as the best R&B and hip-hop song of 2007. Initially peaking at number 68 on the US Billboard Hot 100 in 2007, the song saw a resurgence in 2013, climbing to number 46 due to a viral video.

The music video, co-directed by Beyoncé and Anthony Mandler, draws inspiration from The Frug, a dance sequence in Bob Fosse's film adaptation of the Broadway musical Sweet Charity. The video features cameo appearances from Solange, Rowland, and Williams and was nominated for video of the Year at the 2007 VH1 Soul Vibe Awards. Beyonce promoted "Get Me Bodied" with performances on her world tours and at the 2007 BET Awards. In April 2011, Beyoncé re-recorded the song as "Move Your Body" for former First Lady Michelle Obama's Let's Move! Flash Workout campaign. An instructional video featuring the new version was distributed to schools as part of the initiative.

== Background and development ==
"When I wrote it, I said "three best friends" because I was thinking about them. They make me laugh so hard, and we are so silly together. Like, we're trying to pretend that we're fierce, but in between takes, we're laughing [uproariously] at our inside jokes."

—
—Beyoncé, Billboard

Following the completion of filming for Dreamgirls, Beyoncé began working on her second solo studio album, B'Day. Reflecting on that period, she stated, "[When filming ended] I had so many things bottled up, so many emotions, so many ideas".

To bring this ideas to life, Beyoncé reached out to American songwriter and producer Sean Garrett, and booked a session at Sony Music Studios in New York City, New York, where "Get Me Bodied" was recorded. She also enlisted American hip hop producer and rapper Kasseem "Swizz Beatz" Dean, her sister Solange, her cousin Angela Beyince, and songwriter Makeba Riddick.

Beyoncé drew inspiration from Solange, who contributed to the songwriting process, as well as former Destiny's Child bandmates Kelly Rowland and Michelle Williams. The lyric "three best friends" was a direct reference to Rowland and Williams, capturing the bond they shared.

Garrett stated: "The idea of “getting me bodied” was basically Beyoncé loving New York guys. In New York, they say, “Imma body this n—a when I see him,” and this was the flip of that. She loved flipping what a Brooklyn guy would say, and we did it again on Upgrade U and Diva."

According to Riddick, Beyoncé was very intentional about the music being minimal and letting her vocals be the horns and string section. As they were writing the song, they spoke about different experiences they had as young people going out, which turned into the extended version. She stated that Beyoncé wanted to name all the classic dances.

== Release ==
"Get Me Bodied" and "Green Light" were initially planned as the next two singles from B'Day, following the lead single "Déjà Vu". Beyoncé originally targeted these tracks for the international markets but ultimately chose "Ring the Alarm" as the second single, which peaked at number eleven on the US Billboard Hot 100.

However, Irreplaceable" was officially released as the album's second international and third US single. Instead of being released earlier "Get Me Bodied" was ultimately issued as the sixth and final US single from B'Day, following the release of the deluxe edition's lead single, "Beautiful Liar".

A two-track CD single, featuring the radio edit and extended mix of "Get Me Bodied" was released in the United States on July 10, 2007. Additionally, a ringle version of the song was released on October 23, 2007.

== Music and lyrics ==
"Get Me Bodied"
A sample of "Get Me Bodied", which uses synthesized handclaps and syncopated finger snaps, which are interspersed with background chants and vocal exclamations.

"Get Me Bodied" is a moderate R&B and bounce song, which displays influences of dance-pop, dancehall, and funk music. Jim DeRogatis of Chicago Sun-Times wrote that it is a musical mixture of double Dutch rhyming and reggae-rap. According to the sheet music published at Musicnotes.com by EMI Music Publishing, the song is written in the key of G minor, and is set in common time at a moderate groove of 100 beats per minute. Although the published sheet music states that the song is written in the key of G Minor, the song is actually written in B♭ minor Beyoncé's vocals range from the note of B♯_{b3} to F_{5}. "Get Me Bodied" progresses on a lurching and turgid beat. Its instrumentation includes drum patterns, surging horns, and synthesizers. The song also utilizes handclaps and syncopated interlocked clicks, which are interspersed with background chants, vocal exclamations, vocal gymnastics, and Texas twang. Sasha Frere-Jones of The New Yorker commented that some notes which begin as "legato exhalations" constrict into shouts. Mike Joseph of PopMatters noted that "Get Me Bodied" is "the glorified version" of Gwen Stefani's "Hollaback Girl" (2005).

According to Bill Lamb of About.com, the song "crackle[s] with the spirit and power of a woman who carries her sexuality and spirit with authority." "Get Me Bodied" features Beyoncé as the female protagonist going out an evening; she is suitably dressed to make a lasting impression and get what she is looking for. She is determined to steam up any dance floor she steps onto and make sure that no one resists her call to "get [her] bodied". The lyrics are constructed in the traditional verse-chorus form. "Get Me Bodied" begins with Beyoncé telling her birthdate "9-4-8-1", followed by a group of male voices singing "hey's" and "jump's" for four bars; the first verse then begins. The verses are written like a list where she sings her missions before going to party. It is followed with the chorus and the hook, where Beyoncé sings: "Can you get me bodied? I want to be myself tonight." The second verse follows, the chorus repeats giving way to the bridge, and Beyoncé sings the chorus again, ending the song with "hey!".

== Critical reception ==
"Get Me Bodied" received universal acclaim from music critics who praised its party sound and Beyoncé's vocals. Chris Richards of The Washington Post referred to the track a "club-hungry come-ons" with a "dexterous melody". He further stated that the "skeletal" track "keeps Beyoncé tethered to the ground". Jody Rosen of Entertainment Weekly commented that "a piddly home hi-fi can hardly capture the thunderous grandeur of 'Get Me Bodied,' which sets Beyoncé's harmonies above a pummeling track overseen by rap producer Swiss Beatz". Tim Finney of Pitchfork Media called the track a "percussive, Diwali-esque jam". Us Weekly described "Get Me Bodied" a "snappy dance number." Sasha Frere-Jones of The New Yorker noted that the song sounds "anxious." Mike Joseph of PopMatters noted that the song is very similar to Gwen Stefani's "Hollaback Girl" (2005) and expressed further praise about "Get Me Bodied", writing: "['Get Me Bodied' is] Beyonce’s glorified version of a 'Hollaback Girl'-type song. [...] But listen to way she wails and shouts throughout the song! Gwen Stefani certainly isn’t capable of vocal gymnastics like this. When she sings [...] you can visualize beads of perspiration coming off of her as she shakes to this song."

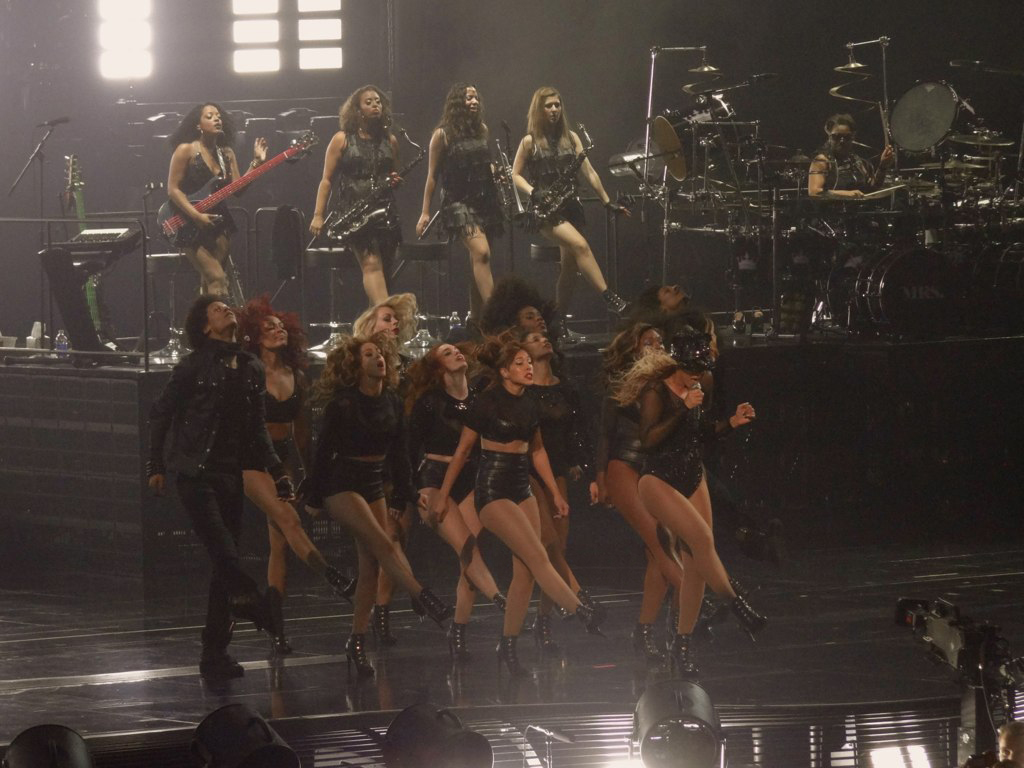
Beyoncé performing "Get Me Bodied" in Montreal during The Mrs. Carter Show World Tour, 2013

Spence D. of IGN Music added that Beyoncé's "crisp voice" seems at odds with the beats featured in the song. However, he continued saying that it "when it gets muted and overlapped on the chorus, it sounds purely hypnotical." Jaime Gill of Yahoo! Music described the track as a "driving" and "strutting" one. Jon Pareles of The New York Times stated: " [...] rhythm-driven songs, especially 'Get Me Bodied', could be high-tech upgrades of an old African-American form, the ring shout [...]". Darryl Sterdan, writing for the Canadian website Jam!, said that the song manages dancing into a contact sport with the help of cheerleader hand-claps. Dave de Sylvia of Sputnikmusic considered "Get Me Bodied" as one of the three production triumphs on B'Day. Richard Cromelin of Los Angeles Times wrote that "Get Me Bodied" sounds "like fun" for Beyoncé, connecting her with deep, vital cultural roots. He also went on saying that "the playful chant" suggests both children's street game and traditional work song, and the whiff of Louisiana in the beat taps her own Creole heritage.

In 2007, Shaheem Reid, Jayson Rodriguez and Rahman Dukes of MTV News placed the song at number five on his year-end list of 27 Essential R&B Songs of 2007. Beyoncé earned the R&B and Hip-Hop Song accolade for "Get Me Bodied" at the 2008 American Society of Composers, Authors and Publishers Awards. In 2013, John Boone and Jennifer Cady of E! Online placed the extended remix of the song at number four on their list of ten best Beyoncé's songs. The same year, the writers of Complex magazine put "Get Me Bodied" at number 9 on their list of 25 best Beyoncé's songs. Heather Haynes writing for the magazine, concluded that the song was a proof that Beyoncé could "kill any and every dance song" further adding, "There's no way you don't start dancing or slow-winding when 'Get Me Bodied' comes on".

== Commercial performance ==
Prior to the official release as a single, "Get Me Bodied" debuted on the US Billboard Hot 100 on May 26, 2007, at number ninety-eight while "Beautiful Liar" and "Irreplaceable" were still on the chart. It was lurking below top fifty approaching its physical release. On August 4, 2007, "Get Me Bodied" peaked at number sixty-eight, and spent a total of eighteen weeks on the Hot 100. "Get Me Bodied" fared better on the US Hot R&B/Hip-Hop Songs, peaking at number ten. It reached number eighty-eight on the US Pop 100. The song also received heavy rotation from the urban contemporary radio stations in the United States. "Get Me Bodied" was ranked at number twenty-six on the US Hot R&B/Hip Hop Songs year-end chart in 2007. In 2013, a video of a woman named Deborah Cohan and her doctors breaking out dancing to the song before she underwent a double mastectomy was posted on YouTube and went viral. Due to Billboard's then-new streaming rules, the song became eligible to chart on the Hot 100, giving it a new peak of number forty-six for the week of November 23, 2013.

== Music video ==
=== Background and release ===
"Get Me Bodied" was one of the music videos shot during the two-week filming for B'Day Anthology Video Album. It was conceptualized by Beyoncé and co-directed by Anthony Mandler. The version of the song used in the clip is the extended mix, which is featured on the deluxe edition of B'Day. The video was shot over two days and choreographed by Frank Gatson Jr, Rhapsody, Todd Sams, Clifford McGhee and Bethany Strong. For the shoot, Beyoncé asked former Destiny's Child group-mates Kelly Rowland, Michelle Williams, and sister Solange to appear with her in the video. She said that it "sets the tone of the video". Beyoncé's mother and stylist, Tina created over 60 outfits for Beyoncé and the 50 extras featured in the video. The instructional dance-oriented video was inspired by the 1960s choreographies. Beyoncé cited influences from the Broadway director-choreographer Bob Fosse, Southern and Jamaican movement and the Frug from the musical Sweet Charity; Erika Ramirez of Billboard magazine further noted that the video was inspired by the scene "Rich Man's Frug" from the movie. She said: "It tells you how to do all the dances — it's modern, it's retro, it's vintage, it's stylized, it's all of those things put together." The story moves from a tony party reminiscent of the jet set style of the sixties, followed with dance sequences. The video was released to US iTunes Store as a Video Triple on September 4, 2007. A re-edit of the video was produced for the Timbaland remix featuring Julio Voltio. Although Voltio does not actually appear in the video, unused footage from the original video was added for the parts he sings. The re-edited video was posted on the MTV Overdrive on July 26, 2007. It was included on the DVD for Irreemplazable (2007).

=== Synopsis ===
Solange Knowles, Beyoncé, Kelly Rowland and Michelle Williams in the music video of "Get Me Bodied".

The video begins with Beyoncé writing the sequence 9-4-8-1 and B'Day on the mirror with her lipstick. As the song begins, she briefly dances in a silver dress around a red room and later answers a telephone on a black couch. She, Solange, Rowland and Williams then walk across a multi-colored room to a black door where they all pose for the camera. As the chorus begins, Beyoncé, Solange, Rowland and Williams step out of a black limousine; they are all sporting matching silver dresses. They execute some dance steps as they walk inside, where people are partying. As the chorus ends, the song is paused while Beyoncé enters a room, where everyone begin to ask who she is, before she answers, "It's B!" and snaps her fingers to start back the music.

She then walks past several people, dances with several men and women in white and black suits and dresses, as the second chorus begins. Beyoncé and the dancers perform a dance routine together, and soon she meets a man, who dances with her. A particular scene shows all the dancers crouch down to the floor, and follow Beyoncé as she walks, before she blows them back. The bridge starts, and the video moves to Beyoncé in a red room, where she and her dancers dance in short skirts, fishnets and black sparkling dresses. The group is later dance in the red and white rooms together. Leading into the final chorus, Beyoncé dances back in the room with the dancers, while Rowland, Williams and her sister sit on a black couch. As the video ends, Beyoncé stands in front of the mirror she was at the start and fades to black as she stares at the viewer through it.

Direct references to the "Rich Man's Frug" include a nearly shot-for-shot recreation of the "who is it?" introduction, the cage and Greek sculptures surrounding a large stage, the two ladies back-to-back parting to reveal Beyonce with two male dancers, and many dance steps from "The Heavyweight" portion of Fosse's choreography.

=== Reception ===
MTV's Tamar Anitai reviewed the video positively, describing it as a "swashbuckling showstopper" and adding, "But, sorry ladies, B shines brightest front and center, looking glittery, glorious and, of course, gorgeous, and more glam than ever before." Anitai further wrote that the "seriously sick" dance sequence in the video spans the history of late 20th-century modern dance, from Jerome Robbins, Bob Fosse, Janet Jackson and Fatima Robinson. He added that the video showcases Beyoncé's metamorphosis into a "highly sophisticated" dancer, and one who can seriously shake it in sky-high stilettos to boot. Anitai concluded his review by writing that Beyoncé unveiled her onstage alter ego Sasha Fierce for the mini movie with "epic" dance scenes while channeling her inner Lena Horne, Chita Rivera and Tina Turner. The music video for "Get Me Bodied" was nominated in the category for Video of the Year at the 2007 VH1 Soul Vibe Awards. In 2013, John Boone and Jennifer Cady of E! Online placed the video at number two on their list of Beyoncé's ten best music videos writing that "She wears a slinky silver dress and has a ponytail ready for whipping, so yeah, she's hot."

== Live performances ==
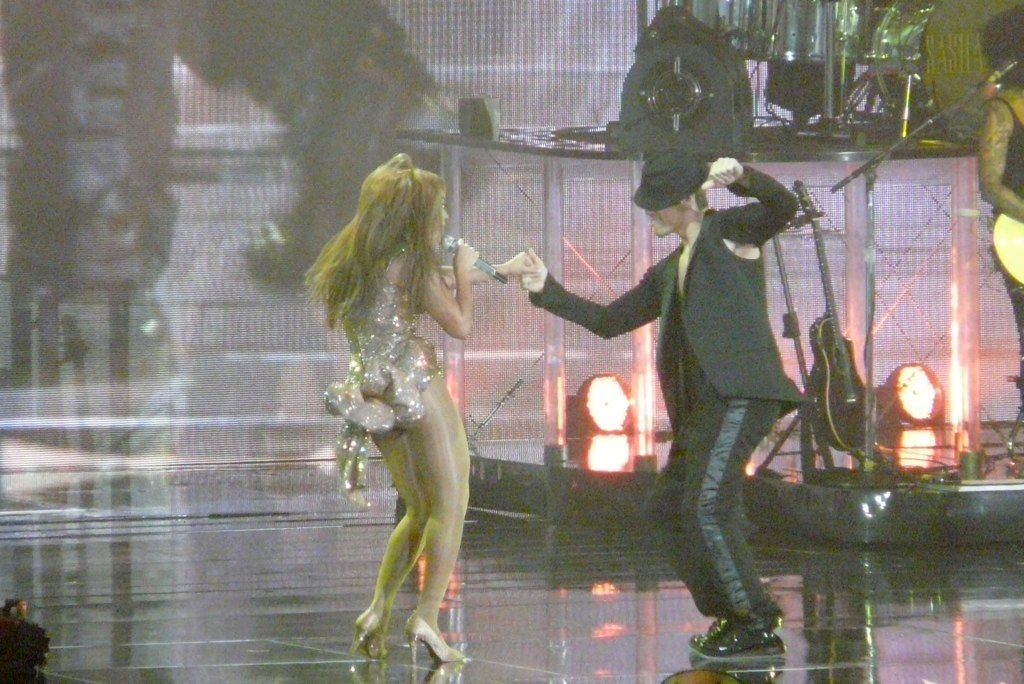
Beyoncé performing "Get Me Bodied" on her I Am... World Tour, 2009

Beyoncé first performed "Get Me Bodied" at the 2007 BET Awards on June 27. She was wearing a gold robot gear, which she whittled down to sleek gold lame pants and a matching bra top. As she continued singing, her sister-singer Solange Knowles and fellow Destiny Child member Michelle Williams appeared onstage as her back-up dancers. A few moments later, Beyoncé introduced Kelly Rowland to the stage to perform her solo hit "Like This" (2007) with American rapper Eve. After her performance, Beyoncé and Williams appeared onstage with Rowland to complete the Destiny's Child reunion. Sandy Cohen of the Associated Press described Beyoncé's performance as "show-stopping". A writer of Rap-Up wrote that Beyoncé "killed it" with the "best performance of the night". Despite the televised live performance, "Get Me Bodied" was a part of the set list on three of Beyoncé's world tours.

For the performance of the song during The Beyoncé Experience (2007), Beyoncé sported a robot outfit similar to the one she wore at the BET Awards; however, this time she was dressed in yellow and black like a bumblebee. As she started, she declared that she was the "queen bee — or Queen B". During the end of the performance, Beyoncé led the crowd in a dance routine calling out a series of movements and then executing them. While reviewing the performance of the song on August 5, 2007, at the Madison Square Garden in Manhattan, Shaheem Reid of MTV News called it "another roof-burner". Jon Pareles of The New York Times also complimented the performance, writing that the concert was a showcase for Beyoncé's consistently expanding music like the kinetic dance beats of "Get Me Bodied". Frank Scheck of The Hollywood Reporter included the "raising version" of "Get Me Bodied" as a highlight of the evening. While reviewing the concert in Anaheim in September, Lee Hildebrand from the San Francisco Chronicle felt that none of the supporting dancers could upstage Beyoncé during the performance of the "infectiously syncopated" song. Ann Powers of the Los Angeles Times described the performance of the song during the tour as "rowdy" noting that it "foregrounded the connection between Beyoncé's percussive vocal style and her love of street dance". "Get Me Bodied" was included on Beyoncé's live album The Beyoncé Experience Live (2007) which was filmed during her concert in Los Angeles during the tour.

"Get Me Bodied" was also included in the set list of the I Am... World Tour (2009–10) and the revue I Am... Yours which was also part of the tour. Prior to the performance of the song, Beyoncé asked the crowd "Are ya'll ready to dance?" and went on singing it wearing a sequin dress with a big bow on the back while performing dance routines with her background dancers. While reviewing Beyoncé's performance at the O2 Arena in London, Michael Cragg of the website musicOMH noted that the song was executed with "in double-quick time". A writer of Billboard magazine noted that the song was performed with high energy during Beyoncé's concert at the Madison Square Garden. However, while reviewing Beyoncé's concert in Perth in September, 2009, Jay Hana from The Sunday Times felt that the show was "only let down by weaker, less melodic songs such as Get Me Bodied". The song was included on the live albums I Am... World Tour (2010) which contained performances filmed during the tour and I Am... Yours: An Intimate Performance at Wynn Las Vegas filmed during the eponymous revue. In late May, 2012, Beyoncé performed "Get Me Bodied" during her Revel Presents: Beyoncé Live revue in Atlantic City, New Jersey, United States' entertainment resort, hotel, casino and spa, Revel. During the performance Beyoncé and her back-up dancers performed a swing dance and formations inspired by Bob Fosse. Chuck Darrow of The Philadelphia Inquirer was positive about the performance of the song during the revue, saying, "As for the music, Beyonce kept the needle in the red zone for much of the show, dealing primarily in such full-throttle, groove-intensive signature tracks as... 'Get Me Bodied'". Brad Wete of Complex magazine wrote that Beyoncé was "shimmying" while performing "Get Me Bodied". In 2013, "Get Me Bodied" was added to the set list of The Mrs. Carter Show World Tour. In 2018, she performed the song with Solange during her Coachella headlining performance. In 2023, Beyoncé performed the song in a melody with "Church Girl" off of her album Renaissance (2022) on the Renaissance World Tour.

== Cover versions ==
Girl Talk included a sample of "Get Me Bodied" in the song "No Pause" from his album Feed the Animals (2008). During the finale of the tenth season of American Idol on May 25, 2011, the lady contestants joined onstage to perform "Get Me Bodied" along with a medley of Beyoncé's other hit singles. Adam Graham from MTV News noted that "each singer [was] working the stage with maximum 'tude."

== "Move Your Body" ==
=== Let's Move! Flash Workout ===
Beyoncé reworked her original "Get Me Bodied" into a new song titled "Move Your Body" (2011). She joined forces with US First Lady Michelle Obama and the National Association of Broadcasters Education Foundation to promote the national Let's Move! campaign, which aims to combat child obesity by prompting youngsters to become more active. Beyoncé actually reworked "Get Me Bodied" and renamed it "Move Your Body" for the Let's Move! Flash Workout initiative itself. A Spanish version was also created entitled "Mueve el Cuerpo". Concerning the campaign, Beyoncé expressed herself:

"It's all about promoting the benefits of healthy eating and exercise... But what we want to do is make it fun by doing something that we all love to do, and that's dance. I am excited to be part of this effort that addresses a public health crisis. First Lady Michelle Obama deserves credit for tackling this issue directly, and I applaud the NAB Education Foundation for trying to make a positive difference in the lives of our schoolchildren."

The lyrics of the original song were switched to fit the cause. The new lyrics include the line: "A little sweat ain’t hurt nobody [...] Don't just stand there on the wall, everybody just move your body, move your body, move your body." The song is a step-by-step flash dance-style workout that combines elements of hip hop music, Latin music as well as dancehall moves with traditional exercise. Nicole James of MTV Buzzworthy described "Move Your Body" as a "kid-friendlier" version of the original. Risa Dixon of Newsday praised the reworked version, calling it "a fun, yet cardio-intensive workout song to get young people excited about exercising."

=== Music video ===
The staff members of Idolator showed high favoritism for the acclaimed campaign, further stating the fact that "when Beyonce tells people to dance, they tend to listen" and so they considered that it was "a pretty genius move" on Michelle Obama's part to get Beyoncé in on her 'Let's Move!' campaign to fight childhood obesity. On April 9, 2011, an instructional video featuring a group of teenagers dancing to "Move Your Body" was released online. After a few days, Beyoncé has said that she "would record her own version of the exercise routine" to show kids how it is done by shooting a new music video featuring a series of fun workouts to accompany the track. On April 26, 2011, Beyoncé released a video directed by Melina Matsoukas for "Move Your Body". In the video, students join Beyoncé to perform choreography by Frank Gatson. In the choreography, Beyoncé and the students mix salsa, dancehall, The Running Man, Dougie, stomp. The music video for "Move Your Body" takes place as a four-minute long flash mob. The video begins during lunch hour at what looks like a junior high cafeteria. Everything is normal until Beyoncé, wearing short shorts and green knee-high socks, enters the cafeteria doors to begin the song. After Beyoncé's entry, all the kids jump to their feet, following along as Beyoncé leads the group through all kinds of dances.

Beyoncé in the music video of "Move Your Body" with several students, dancing along.

The instructional video was distributed to participating schools across the country on May 3, 2011, during a 'dance-in'. Beyoncé was at P.S. 161 middle school in Harlem on that particular date. She taught students the moves from her "Move Your Body" video. Beyoncé appeared in the gym much to the delight of her young fans, who danced alongside her and took photos. Lauretta Charlton of BET gave the video a positive review stating that "It's impossible to watch without wanting to, well, move your body." Nicole James of MTV Buzzworthy showed great interest in the video and its message, stating that Beyoncé gets kids heart pumping, "in more ways than one". Genevieve Koski of The A.V. Club added that "if anything can help curb the nation's childhood obesity problem, it is the galvanizing power of Beyoncé Knowles dancing", and further praised how "[the] bunch of cute kids [were] doing the Running Man and The Dougie in the cafeteria with Beyoncé." A writer of Rap-Up described Beyoncé's dance moves in the video as "hot". Mike Barthel of The Village Voice described the video as "adorable" and classified it as an "important moment in the relationship between politics and culture". Barthel also praised the patriotic scene where Beyoncé and the kids wave the American flag, saying that "It doesn't feel jingoistic, or pandering, or aggressive; it just feels celebratory, like they are actually kinda happy about America."

== Track listings ==
- US CD single
1. "Get Me Bodied" (Radio Edit) – 4:00
2. "Get Me Bodied" (Extended Mix) – 6:18
- US CD Maxi Single
1. "Get Me Bodied" (Extended Mix) – 6:21
2. "Get Me Bodied" (Timbaland Remix featuring Voltio) – 6:17
3. "Get Me Bodied" (Timbaland Remix featuring Fabolous) – 4:50

== Credits and personnel ==
Credits for "Get Me Bodied" adapted from B'Day deluxe edition liner notes.

- Angela Beyincé – writing
- Jim Caruana – recording
- Sean Garrett – writing, production
- Jason Goldstein – mixing
- Beyoncé Knowles – vocals, writing, production
- Solange Knowles – writing
- Makeba – writing
- Swizz Beatz – writing, production, mixing, background vocals
- Steve Tolle – assistant mixing

== Charts ==
=== Weekly charts ===
| Chart (2007–2013) | Peak position |
|---|---|
| US Billboard Hot 100 | 46 |
| US Hot R&B/Hip-Hop Songs (Billboard) | 10 |
| US R&B/Hip-Hop Airplay (Billboard) | 8 |
| US Pop 100 (Billboard) | 88 |

=== Year-end charts ===
| Chart (2007) | Position |
|---|---|
| US Hot R&B/Hip Hop Songs (Billboard) | 26 |

== Certifications and sales ==
| Region | Certification | Certified units/sales |
|---|---|---|
| Australia (ARIA) | Gold | 35,000^{‡} |
| United States (RIAA) | Platinum | 1,000,000^{‡} |
^{‡} Sales+streaming figures based on certification alone.

== Release history ==
Release dates and formats for "Get Me Bodied"
| Region | Date | Format(s) | Label(s) | Ref. |
|---|---|---|---|---|
| United States | July 10, 2007 | CD | Columbia; Music World | |
| United States | October 23, 2007 | Maxi CD (ringle) | Columbia; Music World | |
