= I Am... Yours =

2009 concert residency by Beyoncé

- Residency by Beyoncé
- Location: Paradise, Nevada, U.S.
- Venue: Encore Theater
- Associated album: I Am... Sasha Fierce
- Start date: July 30, 2009
- End date: August 2, 2009
- No. of shows: 4

Beyoncé concert chronology
- I Am... Tour (2009–10); I Am... Yours (2009); 4 Intimate Nights with Beyoncé (2011)

I Am... Yours was the first concert residency by American singer Beyoncé. It was held four consecutive nights in July and August 2009 in support of her third studio album, I Am... Sasha Fierce (2008). The residency was held at the Encore Theater in the Wynn Las Vegas on the Las Vegas Strip in Paradise, Nevada. Beyoncé performed over thirty songs backed by an orchestra and her all-female band, the Suga Mamas, to an audience of 1,500. The residency was deemed "an intimate encounter" as Beyoncé portrayed a more raw and uninhibited show versus her previous concert performances. The concept of the shows revolves around Beyoncé's recording career.

I Am... Yours received positive response from music critics who praised the intimate performances and Beyoncé's vocals as well as the jazz, funk and orchestral arrangements of the songs. The success of I Am... Yours has led Wynn Resorts to ask Beyoncé to return as a residency act. A double disc CD and DVD, I Am... Yours: An Intimate Performance at Wynn Las Vegas, was released in November 2009, featuring the performance recorded on August 2, 2009. It contained the full concert, a behind-the-scenes feature, along with an audio CD of the concert. I Am... Yours: An Intimate Performance at Wynn Las Vegas was aired on several TV Networks as a special.

== Background and development ==
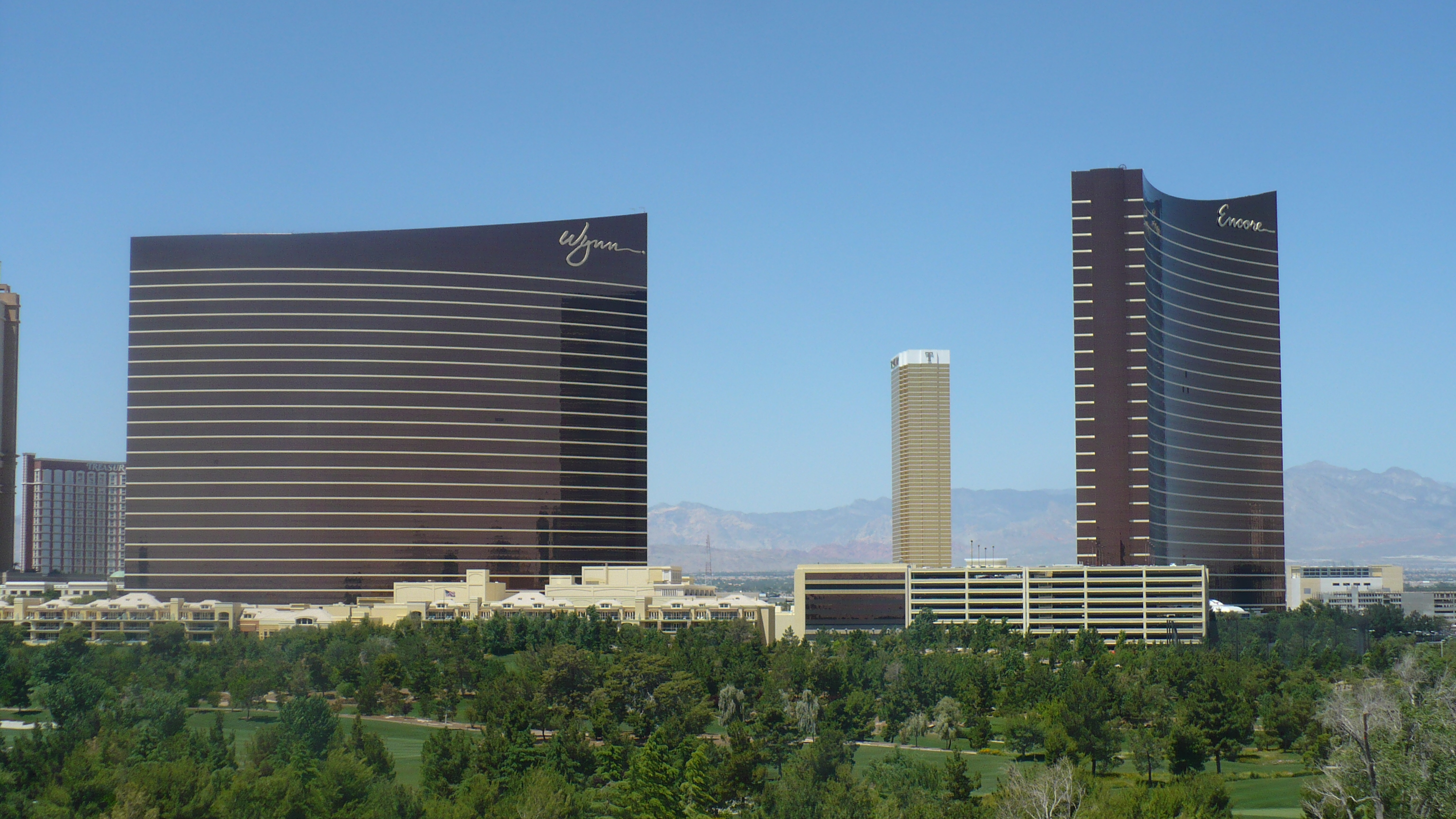
The concerts were held at the Encore Theater in Wynn Las Vegas to a standing-audience.

When Beyoncé's I Am... Tour (2009–2010), was announced in 2008 by Entertainment Weekly, the article mentioned Beyoncé would perform a week-long Las Vegas showcase. As tour dates were announced, it was later revealed that Beyoncé would perform four shows in Las Vegas. The concerts were held at the Encore Theatre on the Las Vegas Strip in Paradise, Nevada to a standing room-only audience of 1,500. Tickets for the first three shows were sold out after they were made available, but the ones for the fourth night were sold slowly with Las Vegas Sun reporting that ninety percent of the tickets were sold. The prices for the tickets were from $250 to $1,000. According to Beyoncé, the show is an "unplugged" version of her normal concerts; she removed all the elaborate costumes and theatrics of her latest tour and performed with her band, Suga Mama, and a small team of dancers. Regarding the concerts, she told ABC News,

"I've always wanted to perform in Las Vegas, I've always wanted to do my own show there, because a lot of the icons that I look up to had amazing shows in Las Vegas. I thought if I'm going to have my own Las Vegas show, it has to be right and it has to have heart and soul and it has to be something memorable... My whole objective here is for people to see what they don't get to see. Just give me my band, give me a stage, some cool smoke and lights and you see the sweat, you see the pain, you see the love, you see the soul and it's about music."

During the documentary, "What Happens in Vegas...", Beyoncé stated that when the idea of a Vegas show was presented to her, she wanted the show to be a complete 180 from her current tour. Also, she did not want it to be the typical Las Vegas showcase. She wanted to remove the theatrics and "consciously show that I don't need any of that stuff. Just give me my band, a stage and some cool smoke and lights." Beyoncé and her production quickly organized the show in seven days, based on a script provided by filmmaker Matthew Dickens. She often rehearsed during sound checks of her 2009 tour.

The concept of the shows revolves around Beyoncé's recording career, from her early childhood beginnings to the star she is today. She revealed, "In the beginning, I'm gonna start out, sing and make it about my songwriting, my arrangements, my band and my love for music. Then, I'm gonna tell my story. This way, I can sing all of the hit songs, the songs that people want. But, it's a deeper meaning... these songs meant more than just the chorus that's catchy... it's my life." Since the show was created last minute, there were many changes. Originally, the set list included, "Ego", "At Last", "Listen", "Ring the Alarm", and "Upgrade U". These songs were later removed from the set list and a new one was added with additional instruments. The success of the show has led Wynn Resorts to ask Beyoncé to return as a residency act.

== About the show ==
=== Fashion and stage ===
The stage contained wind machines, lasers, arena lighting, a teleprompter on the back and a retro, mood-lit platform during the performances of the songs. According to Nate Chinen of The New York Times, "the stagecraft... keeps a viewer at a worshipful remove". During a statement before the show, Beyoncé revealed, "We have designed an elegant and beautiful stage and we will have new costumes that are being designed especially for this show." Beyoncé is accompanied by an orchestra and her 18-member all-female band on stage "whose satin interpretations pump lush over pomp" according to Mike Ragogna of The Huffington Post. She is also backed by several dancers during the performances of several songs and also appears alone during some performances. The choreography for the show was developed by Beyoncé's collaborator Frank Jr. Gatson. The set list included performances of over thirty songs, both from Beyoncé's solo career and as part of the girl group Destiny's Child. During the show, one major costume change was made. Beyoncé first appeared in beaded Jean Paul Gaultier couture and then in a cape-like jacket for the first half of the show. Both pieces were worn on top of a figure-flaunting grey bodysuit. For the second part, Beyoncé traded the bodysuit for a black sequined, bathing suit-like number. Several costumes for the stage during the show were also designed by Beyoncé's mother Tina Knowles, who was her designer for many years. Arseniuk of Las Vegas Weekly praised the costumes of the show, saying that Beyoncé "sparkled from beginning to end". She noted that the first costume "left little to the imagination" while the second one "left no curve unnoticed".

=== Show synopsis ===
The show begins with a narrator introducing Beyoncé to the audience. She appears from the back of the theater performing "Hello". She greets the audience and makes her way towards the stage as she continues to perform. At the stage, Beyoncé sings "Halo". Next, she performs "Irreplaceable" and interacts with the audience. She later moves into an acoustic medley, performing a down-tempo version of "Sweet Dreams", "Dangerously in Love 2" and "Sweet Love" (originally recorded by Anita Baker). The medley leads into "If I Were a Boy" (which contains excerpts from "You Oughta Know") and "Scared of Lonely". The show continues with a performance of "That's Why You're Beautiful", intertwined with excerpts from "The Beautiful Ones" (originally recorded by Prince), "Satellites", and "Resentment". The first act concludes with Beyoncé performing a jazz-fused "Déjà Vu". Before the next act begins, three dancers appear and perform a tap sequence called "Bebop".

Beyoncé begins the second act by telling the story of her career, starting from when she was nine years old when she auditioned for the talent show Star Search to her then-latest album I Am... Sasha Fierce (2008). Beyoncé highlights that one of the first songs she remembers learning was Michael Jackson's "I Wanna Be Where You Are". She continues with a medley of Destiny's Child's hits songs, including "No No No", "Bug a Boo", "Bills, Bills, Bills", and "Say My Name" whilst in between the songs, she talks about the story behind them. The medley leads into "Work It Out" and "'03 Bonnie & Clyde", as she now begins to talk about the start her solo career. As the set continues, Beyoncé explains how her record company felt her debut album did not have "one" hit song. She sarcastically remarks, "I guess they were kinda right... I had five." Beyoncé goes on to perform "Crazy in Love" (reminiscent of "Proud Mary" by Tina Turner), "Naughty Girl" and "Get Me Bodied". As the show draws to a close, Beyoncé performs "Single Ladies (Put a Ring on It)"; she then exits the stage after thanking the audience for their presence.

== Critical reception ==
"[...] beyond the customary thanks, introductions and shout-outs, Knowles' banter is thin on the ground – requests for the crowd to get up on their feet are answered, and the singer's patter is perfunctory rather than particularly tailored to this occasion. But this is a polished, professional performance... Knowles doesn't put a dangerously high heel wrong at any step. The stories that precede her cover versions are neatly scripted, succinct and fit the flow of the set well. Her vocals peak and dip, tremble and roar, mercifully without ever hitting Mariah Carey levels of skull-rattling intensity. All told, all boxes ticked.

— Mike Diver, BBC Online

Overall, the show received a positive response from many music critics. Mike Weatherford of the Las Vegas Review-Journal wrote, "The spectacle rivals Celine Dion's 'A New Day' as the singer transforms from fragile soul to the rock warrior alter ego of her album title, I Am ... Sasha Fierce." Melissa Arseniuk of Las Vegas Weekly wrote in her review of the show, "Once Beyoncé took to the stage, she hardly left it. Appearing both on her own and with back-up dancers, she worked the theater from left to right throughout the showcase. She sang, danced, and looked good while she did it... Indeed, the mezzo-soprano is as easy on the eyes as she is on the ears." John Griffiths of Us Weekly described the concert as "lavish". Andy Kellman from Allmusic wrote, "The show is certainly a theatrical production worthy of Vegas, with Beyoncé and her large backing band energetically rolling through the singer's back catalog."

Darryl Sterdan of the website Jam! commented: "Only Beyonce would think an 'intimate' theatre gig should include her massive all-girl band, an orchestra, lasers, dancers, costume changes and a wind machine to keep her hair blowing majestically. And only Beyonce could pull it all together as superbly as she does in this 98-minute... show". A writer of The Boston Globe praised I Am... Yours, comparing it with Sin City. He commended the jazz interlude, the acoustic rearrangements of the songs, and the "charming B[eyoncé] telling her life story in [the] song[s]". Mike Ragogna of The Huffington Post compared Beyoncé with Diana Ross during the show and added: "This 'concert' is a staged, stripped-down reconfiguration by Beyoncé... of her current touring extravaganza that covers her biggest hits... as she whisks us through her career highlights in two tidy acts plus an 'intermission' that is nothing of the sort (it's a jazz medley with a dance payoff)." He finished his review by saying, "Beyoncé's I Am...Yours is a satisfying decade-and-then-some retrospective that reveals the artist's interesting back story with a personal warmth".

Mike Diver of BBC Online reviewed the show positively and said, "this is an entirely second-guessable affair, each movement telegraphed and every realigned arrangement (bombast turned down, jazz and funk switched up) meeting the listener's expectations head on." The writer of People magazine described the show as a "magic". Nate Chinen of The New York Times positively noted that I Am... Yours documents a smaller show than the other ones Beyoncé usually makes. A less favorable review came from Margaret Lyons of Entertainment Weekly. She writes, "I just wish this special had the balls to call itself 'I Am…Mine' and admit that among the many things we admire about Beyonce is that she's not ours. In fact the opposite's true. We're hers".

== Broadcasts and recordings ==
A double disc CD and DVD, titled I Am... Yours: An Intimate Performance at Wynn Las Vegas, was released in November 2009, featuring the performance recorded on August 2, 2009. The collection featured the full concert (though her cover of "The Beautiful Ones" was not present), a behind-the-scenes feature, along with an audio CD of the concert. The collection was very successful, debuting at number 1 on the US Billboard Top Music Video chart. The album was also successful on the other DVD and albums charts across the world. The live performance of "Halo" during the show, which is featured on the album, was nominated for Best Female Pop Vocal Performance at the 53rd Annual Grammy Awards.

ABC Network aired a one-hour Thanksgiving television special called Beyoncé – I Am... Yours on November 26, 2009. A one-minute trailer of the special was posted online on November 12, 2009; it showed Beyoncé's during her I Am... Tour, behind-the-scenes footage including rehearsals, as well as personal videos. The special featured various songs from the show, as well as backstage footage, showing Beyoncé and her team preparing for the shows. The show was a success, drawing in nearly five million viewers. Black Entertainment Television aired the entire concert including songs that were not featured on the ABC special. In the United Kingdom, I Am... Yours was broadcast on Channel 4 on December 25, 2009, (Christmas Day morning), following an hour-long documentary named Beyoncé: For The Record. Several videos of the live performances of "Halo", "Single Ladies (Put a Ring on It)" and "Scared of Lonely" were released at MTV Latin America in 2010 and 2011. These videos were used to promote the album in Latin America and the television special "MTV World Stage: Beyoncé Live from Las Vegas".

== Set list ==
1. "Hello"
2. "Halo"
3. "Irreplaceable"
4. "Sweet Dreams" / "Dangerously in Love 2" / "Sweet Love"
5. "If I Were a Boy"
6. "You Oughta Know"
7. "Scared of Lonely"
8. "That's Why You're Beautiful" / "The Beautiful Ones"
9. "Satellites"
10. "Resentment"
11. "Déjà Vu"
12. "I Wanna Be Where You Are"
13. "No, No, No" / "Bug a Boo" / "Bills, Bills, Bills"
14. "Say My Name"
15. "Jumpin', Jumpin'"
16. "Independent Women" / "Bootylicious"
17. "Survivor"
18. "Work It Out"
19. "'03 Bonnie & Clyde"
20. "Crazy in Love"
21. "Naughty Girl"
22. "Get Me Bodied"

Encore

23. "Single Ladies (Put a Ring on It)"
