= Resentment (Beyoncé song) =

2006 song by Beyoncé

Song by Beyoncé

from the album B'Day
- Released: September 1, 2006
- Recorded: April 2006
- Studio: The Lair Studios (Los Angeles, CA); Sony Music Studios (New York, NY)
- Genre: R&B
- Length: 4:42
- Label: Columbia
- Songwriters: Beyoncé Knowles; Walter W. Millsap III; Candice Nelson; Curtis Mayfield
- Producers: Walter W. Millsap III; Candice Nelson; Beyoncé Knowles

"Resentment" is a song written by Walter W. Millsap III, Candice Nelson, and Curtis Mayfield, and originally performed by Victoria Beckham. The song was later recorded with additional lyrics by American singer Beyoncé, who included it on her second studio album B'Day (2006). It is an emotive ballad whose lyrics describe a woman who feels hurt and angry after her partner lies to and cheats on her.

"Resentment" was originally intended for inclusion on Beckham's unreleased studio album, Come Together, but was eventually included as a bonus feature on the documentary video release The 'Réal' Beckhams (2004). American singer Jazmine Sullivan also recorded a rendition of the song in 2004, which remains unreleased.

The original version of the song was composed by Walter W. Millsap III and Candice Nelson and used the instrumental from Curtis Mayfield's "Think" from the 1972 film Super Fly. For her rendition, Beyoncé rearranged the structure of the song by changing the order of the lyrics, adding a chorus, and writing new lyrics. She also produced the song with Millsap III and Nelson.

Beyoncé's version was well received by music critics, who praised her powerful vocal performance and vulnerability. Based on downloads alone, it charted at number 11 on the Billboard Bubbling Under R&B/Hip-Hop Singles chart. She performed the song during her revue shows I Am... Yours (2009) and Revel Presents: Beyoncé Live (2012). It was also included on the live album I Am... Yours: An Intimate Performance at Wynn Las Vegas (2009).

== Background and composition ==
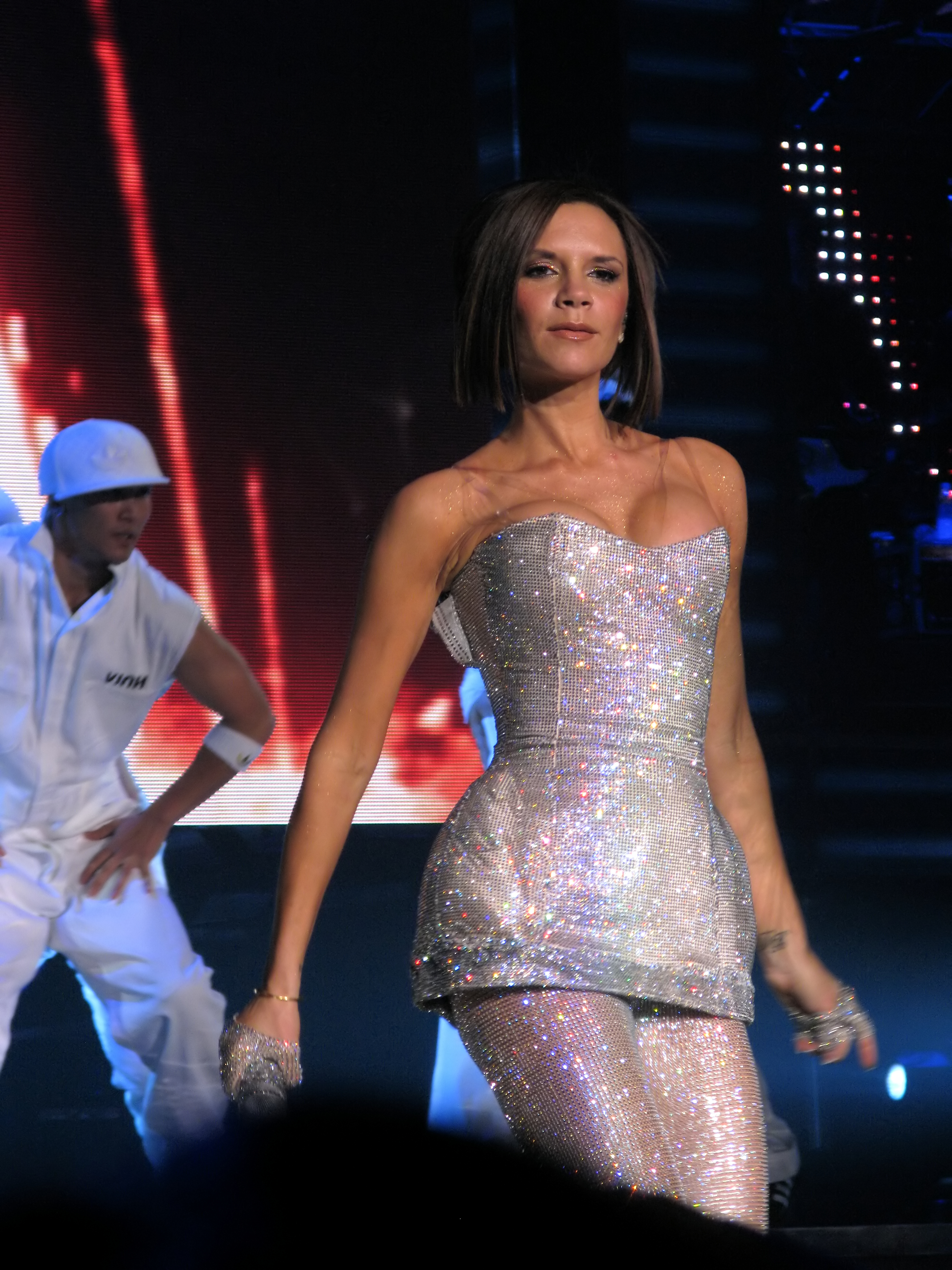
"Resentment" was originally written for Beckham, who recorded the song in 2003.

"Resentment" was written by Walter M. Millsap III and Candice Nelson and originally recorded by Jazmine Sullivan but never released. Later, it was recorded again by Victoria Beckham in 2003. It was included as a bonus feature on a documentary video release starring Beckham and her husband David, titled The 'Réal' Beckhams (2004). The track uses Curtis Mayfield's 1972 "Think (Instrumental)", from the Super Fly soundtrack.

When recording her version of "Resentment" in 2006, Beyoncé contributed additional writing and production. In an interview with 4Music, Beyoncé discussed the song: "The song on my new album I am proudest of is probably 'Resentment'. I feel like vocally I've grown, I feel like all the chord changes and the beautiful harmonies and the lyrics is something that I really am proud of".

In 2026, Nelson told Billboard: "I was in Atlanta when Walt told me Beyoncé cut “Resentment.” I was sure that it was going to be great, but once I actually heard it, I thought all the subtle changes and the modulation were incredible." Millsap III completed:

I wasn’t there, but Beyoncé cut the vocal at Sony during an unscheduled session. It’s the same melody from Candice’s demo, but when [Beyoncé] sent her version back, she added a modulation and tricked out the background vocals. I would have never modulated the record, but that’s the genius of Beyoncé. [...] I thought her vocal control was amazing, and the nuances of her intonation and placement were so good.

"Resentment" is a passionate ballad about a gritty, agitated goodbye that adds a "different kind of overwrought drama". The track is written in the key of E major. "Resentment" features a slow groove of 70 beats per minute, with Beyoncé's vocal range spanning from F♯_{3} to E_{5}. It is built around a honeyed sample of Curtis Mayfield's "Think". In "Resentment", Beyoncé sings about infidelity and a boyfriend who cheats on and lies to her, as heard in the lines "I've been crying for too long/ What did you do to me?/ You lied, you lied, you lied." In the song, Beyoncé presents a more vulnerable side of herself by showing that she does not want her boyfriend to leave her for another woman.

== Critical reception ==
Beyoncé's version of "Resentment" received positive reviews from critics, most of whom noted the soulful vocal stylings used in the song. Gail Mitchell of Billboard stated that Beyoncé "shifts into emotive mode" on this song from the album's "rockier, edgier" sound and noted that the track "calls to mind the subtle fervor and passion of the best girl groups of the '60s and '70s". Brian Hiatt of Rolling Stone marked the track as "one of the most arresting moments" on the album and described it as an "anguished, sixties-tinged ballad". Spence Abbott of IGN also noted the track as a standout alongside "Irreplaceable" and observed that "[the] track goes straight for Aretha Franklin-inspired territory, with Beyoncé actually getting gritty and dropping her high octave range down a few pegs to get guttural and downright Old School soulful".

Jon Pareles of The New York Times stated that the "agitated goodbye" builds a different kind of overwrought drama. Steve Jones of USA Today wrote that the song showcases Beyoncé's "maturing vocal chops," describing it as spare and gritty. Sal Cinquemani of Slant Magazine noted that the song would have been better if performed by a trio of "talented" vocalists, such as Destiny's Child, rather than Beyoncé by herself. Houston Chronicle's Joey Guerra felt that "Doubters of Beyoncé's immense talent need only give one listen to this track ['Resentment'] from 2006's B'Day. It's a stunner — a visceral, emotional showcase that casts Beyoncé as a scorned, sorrowful woman. You can almost feel the pain in her delivery." According to a writer for the Irish Independent, the song gives a more soulful feel to B'Day. Jim Farber of Daily News called "Resentment" an "old-school soul shouter". Sasha Frere-Jones of The New Yorker described the song as a "fierce ballad". "Resentment" peaked at number 11 on the US Bubbling Under R&B/Hip-Hop Singles chart, which acts as an extension to the Hot R&B/Hip-Hop Songs.

== Live performances ==
During Beyoncé's 2009 Las Vegas revue show, I Am... Yours, she performed the song live for the first time. Before the performance, Beyoncé described the song's meaning, stating: "How many of you have ever been lied to? I'm sure everyone has —we all have. But this next song is from my last album, B'Day. And I never performed this song before, this is especially for Encore[...] It talks about a relationship after you've been lied to. And you're trying your best to forgive. But it's difficult because you never forget. It's called 'Resentment'." She also included the song on the 2009 I Am... Yours: An Intimate Performance at Wynn Las Vegas as the ninth track of the DVD/CD's first disc. During a Thanksgiving television special, Beyoncé aired I Am... Yours in its entirety, including her performance of "Resentment". Nate Chinen of The New York Times said, "There's exactly one human-scale moment in the concert, when she sits at the lip of the stage to sing an acoustic treatment of 'Resentment,' from her album 'B'Day.' And even then she makes it a showstopper."

In May 2012, Beyoncé performed "Resentment" as part of her revue show Revel Presents: Beyoncé Live at Revel, an entertainment resort, hotel, casino, and spa in Atlantic City, New Jersey. She introduced it as her "favorite song", and according to Georgette Cline of The Boombox, "fans could feel the pangs of her once-broken heart on 'Resentment,' as she cooed of a lying lover who deceived her". Ben Ratliff of The New York Times mentioned "Resentment" in the "almost continuous high point" of the concert. A writer for the Associated Press noted that Beyoncé "held back tears during a rousing rendition" of the song. According to Chuck Darrow of The Philadelphia Inquirer, the acoustic performance of the ballad "proved a nice respite from the relentless thump-thump-thump of the many dance-pop numbers". Tris McCall of The Star-Ledger wrote that Beyoncé brought the song to life, describing the performance as a "full-scale psychological portrait in three and a half minutes". The live performance of the song during the concerts at Revel was used in Beyoncé's HBO documentary film, Life Is But a Dream (2013). The performance was filmed in a single five-minute shot. Aaron Parsley of People commented that the rendition of "Resentment" was "grittier and angrier" than the previous performances of the song. The song was also included on the set list of Beyoncé's The Mrs. Carter Show World Tour (2013), during several opening shows of the first leg where she performed it on a B-stage.

"Resentment" was performed during Beyoncé and Jay-Z's co-headlining On the Run Tour (2014). During the concert, Beyoncé moved to an island stage in the middle of the stadium, dressed as a bride in white with a floor-length bridal veil and performed the song seated. Video projections showed the pair, dressed in wedding attire, shooting at each other in an abandoned church, followed by images of guns flashing across the screen with the words "this is not real". The footage ended with Beyoncé shooting Jay-Z dead. Kat Bein of the Miami New Times thought that the performance of the song was a "high note" during the concert. Beyoncé also performed the song on her second co-headlining tour with Jay-Z, the On the Run II Tour (2018).

== Credits and personnel ==
Credits are taken from B'Day liner notes.

- Beyoncé Knowles – vocals, production, writing, executive production
- Walter W. Millsap III – production, writing, recording assistance
- Candice Nelson – co-production, writing
- Curtis Mayfield – writing
- Jim Caruana – recording
- Rob Kinelski – recording assistance
- Dave Lopez – recording assistance
- Jason Goldstein – mixing
- Steve Tolle – mixing assistance

== Certifications ==
Certifications for "Resentment"
Region	Certification	Certified units/sales
United States (RIAA)	Gold	500,000^{‡}
^{‡} Sales+streaming figures based on certification alone.
