= Matthew Dickens =

American actor

- Born: Matthew Dickens; October 19, 1961; Nancy, France
- Died: January 8, 2013 (aged 51)
- Occupations: Writer, producer, actor, director
- Website: Posthope website

Matthew Dickens (October 19, 1961 – January 8, 2013) was an American writer, producer, actor and director.

== Early life ==
Matthew Dickens was born in an ambulance on a highway on the outskirts of Nancy, France. Matthew's early training as an actor began at the Duke Ellington School of the Arts in DC, mentored by the late founder, director/choreographer/educator Mike Malone, who he later joined as a company member of the Equity Theater Company at Karamu House in Cleveland, Ohio. Other notable teachers were Kenneth Daugherty (acting), Glenda Dickerson (acting), Donal Leace (theater history), Tony Booker (voice), and Quay Barnes Truitt (costumes and make-up)

Matthew's early training as a dancer included classes at The School of the Cleveland Ballet. In New York, he had a short stay at The Ailey School and studied with David Howard, Finis Jhung, and Frank Hatchett. While performing in New York, he met Debbie Allen. The two went on to work together on numerous projects, including A Different World, Fame, Polly, Carrie, and The Academy Awards.

== Films ==
Year	Title	Role	Notes
1990	Polly	Dancer	Television Film
1990	Polly: Comin’ Home!	Onlooker #1	Television Film
2005	Confessions of an Action Star	Agent #2	Released January 20, 2009
2005	Their Eyes Were Watching God	Principal Dancer	Released March 5, 2005
2005	Rent	Bohemian	
2006	Dreamgirls	Jimmy's Band	

Year	Title	Position	Notes
2004	The Aviator	Choreographer	
2005	Sailing for Madagascar	Choreographer	
2011	Leave It On The Floor	Dance Production Supervisor	
2011	The War Zone 3D	Writer, Producer, Director	

== Television ==
TV appearances include "Fame," guest starring roles on "A Different World", "Quantum Leap," and several commercials. In 1991 Matthew performed in the ABC special “American Dance Honors”, which received an American Emmy Award nomination for the choreography. Matthew appeared on The Debbie Allen Special in 1989 which was nominated for 2 Primetime Emmys and co-starred in the opening number of the 63rd Academy Awards with Jasmine Guy and Steve LaChance.

Year	Title	Role	Notes
1990	In Living Color	Himself	
1991	63rd Academy Awards	Performer	
1992	Fame		Television series
1992	A Different World	Guest Star	
1993	The Arsenio Hall Show	Himself	
2000	The West Wing	Man #3	
2003	The Wayne Brady Show	Himself	

Year	Title	Position	Notes
2000	Euro 2000	Choreographer	
2002	Het Nationale Huwelijksfeest	Choreographer	The Wedding Event for Prins Willem and Maxima of Argentina Amsterdam Arena
2004	NFL Kickoff	Assistant Choreographer	
2004	NFL Thanksgiving Day	Assistant Choreographer	
2005	ESPY Awards	Assistant Choreographer	
2008	The Mole		
2009	I Am... Yours	Writer	Aired November 26, 2009 on ABC

== Stage ==
Matthew was in the original Broadway cast of Sunset Boulevard starring Glenn Close (and later with Betty Buckley and Elaine Paige) having initially appeared in the original Los Angeles production. Matthew returned to the Broadway company of Miss Saigon directly from the Netherlands production, where he played the role of John entirely in Dutch. Other Broadway credits include playing both Chris and John (at different times) in Miss Saigon, C.C. White in Dreamgirls and Stephen King's Carrie. He also co-starred in the original Australian cast of Smokey Joe's Cafe.

=== Broadway ===
Year	Title	Role	Notes
1987	Dreamgirls	Understudy CC White	Ambassador Theatre
1988	Carrie	Matthew, Tommy	Virginia Theatre
1991-2001	Miss Saigon	Chris, John	Broadway Theatre
1994-1997	Sunset Boulevard	Artie Green, Understudy Joe Gillis	Minskoff Theatre

=== Other Theater ===
Year	Title	Role/Position	Notes
1991 & 1992	Phylicia Rashad & Co	Featured Performer	Opening Act for Bill Cosby Las Vegas Hilton
1996	Smokey Joe's Café (Australia)		
1997	nl:Miss Saigon (Netherlands)	John	Fortis Circustheater
1999	The Royal Netherlands Air Force Orchestra	Director, Choreographer, Performer	
2002	Pearl	Ringmaster/Dr. Drewdy	Geffen Playhouse Kennedy Center NAACP Image Award Nomination
2003	A Merry Mancini Christmas	Associate Director	Walt Disney Concert Hall December 23, 2003
2005	Stephen Sondheim's 75th	Ensemble	Hollywood Bowl July 8, 2005

== Death ==
Matthew died of prostate cancer on January 8, 2013.
