= Jam! =

Canadian entertainment news website

- Website type: Online magazine
- Available in: English
- Website: jam.canoe.com
- Current status: Defunct

Jam! was a Canadian website which covered entertainment news. It was part of the Canoe.com online portal, formerly owned and operated by Quebecor through its Sun Media division, and now owned by Postmedia Network.

Jam! was the only media outlet that published a comprehensive collection of the official Canadian record charts as compiled by Nielsen SoundScan and Nielsen Broadcast Data Systems.

CKXT-TV, Sun Media's television station in Toronto, aired a nightly entertainment magazine series, Inside Jam!. However, due to low ratings the program's airtime was reduced substantially. Effective March 24, 2006, the show went from a daily program to a weekend-only show, before being removed from the schedule altogether. One of the hosts of the show, Chris Van Vliet, announced on the programme in February 2010 that he would be leaving the show to join the CBS affiliate in Cleveland as their entertainment reporter. His co-host Tara Slone re-located in August 2010 to Calgary to become co-host of Breakfast Television on CityTV Calgary.

== See also ==
- Canadian Albums Chart
- Canadian Singles Chart
