= 2010 in classical music =

== Events ==
- March 22 – Daniel Barenboim is awarded the Otto Hahn Peace Medal for his work with the West-Eastern Divan Orchestra.
- March 29 – Protesters interrupt a concert by the Jerusalem Quartet at London's Wigmore Hall.
- June 8 – The Gregynog Music Festival opens; performers include Emma Kirkby, Catrin Finch and The Academy of Ancient Music.
- July 11 – Rachel Barton Pine gives a three-part performance at Chicago's Millennium Park as part of the "Great Performers of Illinois" celebration.
- August – Frank Huang leaves the Ying Quartet.
- August 13 – The Three Choirs Festival Youth Choir give their first concert, at Tewkesbury Abbey, performing Handel's "Zadok the Priest", "Water Music (Suite No 2 in D)" and "My Heart is Inditing", and Bach's "Magnificat", accompanied by the Corelli Chamber Orchestra.

== New works ==
The following composers' works were composed, premiered, or published this year, as noted in the citation.

=== B ===
- Steven Bryant – Concerto for Wind Ensemble

=== H ===
- Mehdi Hosseini
  - Taleshi Hava, for solo violin and bassoon
  - An Unfinished Draft, for flute, clarinet, piano, violin, violoncello and baritone
  - Pause, for flute, clarinet, piano, violin, violoncello and tubular bells

=== K ===
- Wojciech Kilar – The Solemn Overture, for symphony orchestra

=== L ===
- Fred Lerdahl – Arches

=== M ===
- Bruno Mantovani – Concerto de chambre nos 1 and 2

=== P ===
- Krzysztof Penderecki
  - Ein feste Burg ist unser Gott for mixed choir, brass, percussion and string orchestra
  - Powiało na mnie morze snów... Pieśni zadumy i nostalgii (A sea of dreams did breathe on me... Songs of reverie and nostalgia)
  - Duo concertante, for violin and double bass
  - Tanz, for solo viola

=== R ===
- Steve Reich – WTC 9/11

=== S ===
- Kaija Saariaho – Mirages
- Esa-Pekka Salonen – Nyx, for orchestra
- Johannes Maria Staud
  - On Comparative Meteorology, for orchestra
  - Contrebande (On Comparative Meteorology II), for orchestra
  - Tondo Preludio, for orchestra
  - Chant d'amour, for ensemble

=== T ===
- Manfred Trojahn – Herbstmusik, for orchestra

=== W ===
- Graham Waterhouse – Chinese Whispers

== Opera premieres ==
| Date | Opera | Composer | Theatre |
|---|---|---|---|
| 18 January | The Child Dreams | Gil Shohat | Israeli Opera |
| 25 February | Il caso Mortara | Francesco Cilluffo | Dicapo Opera |
| 26 February | Vinkensport, or The Finch Opera | David T. Little | Richard B. Fisher Center for the Performing Arts |
| 1 March | Émilie | Kaija Saariaho | Opéra National de Lyon |
| 7 March | Le Bal | Oscar Strasnoy | Hamburg State Opera |
| 12 March | Bliss | Brett Dean | Sydney Opera House |
| 3 March | Knight Crew | Julian Philips | Glyndebourne |
| 17 April | Shadowboxer | Frank Proto | University of Maryland School of Music, Clarice Smith Performing Arts Center |
| 30 April | Moby-Dick | Jake Heggie | Dallas Opera |
| 7 May | Queen of Knives | Eric Stern | Interstate Firehouse Cultural Center, Portland, Oregon |
| 8 May | Amelia | Daron Hagen | Seattle Opera |
| 13 June | The Golden Ticket | Peter Ash | Opera Theatre of Saint Louis |
| 4 July | Un Retour | Oscar Strasnoy | Aix-en-Provence Festival |
| 24 July | Life is a Dream | Lewis Spratlan | Santa Fe Opera |
| 7 August | Sonya's Story | Neal Thornton | Riverside Studios, London |
| 10 September | ’u’ | Eef van Breen | Theater Zeebelt, The Hague |
| 25 September | Gisela! | Hans Werner Henze | Maschinenhalle Zeche Zweckel, Gladbeck, Germany |
| 8 October | Pecan Summer | Deborah Cheetham | WestSide Performing Arts Centre, Mooroopna, Australia |
| 22 October | Río de Sangre | Don Davis | Florentine Opera, Milwaukee, Wisconsin, United States |

== Albums ==
- Jack Cooper – The Chamber Wind Music of Jack Cooper
- Jackie Evancho – O Holy Night
- Jon Lord – To Notice Such Things
- Frederik Magle – Like a Flame
- Maksim Mrvica – Appassionata
- Les Prêtres – Spiritus Dei

== Musical films ==
- Kinshasa Symphony

== Deaths ==
- January 8 – Otmar Suitner, Austrian conductor, 87
- January 22 – Surendran Reddy, South African pianist and composer, 47
- January 23 – Earl Wild, US pianist, 94
- February 2 – Nelli Shkolnikova, Russian violinist, 81
- February 9 – Jacques Hétu, Canadian composer and music teacher, 71
- February 11 – Irina Arkhipova, Russian operatic mezzo-soprano and later contralto, 85
- February 17 – Kathryn Grayson, 88, American soprano and film star
- February 18 – Ariel Ramírez, Argentine composer, 88
- March 4 – Amalie Christie, Norwegian classical pianist, author and anthroposophist, 96
- March 5 – Philip Langridge, English operatic tenor, 70
- March 17 – Ştefan Gheorghiu, Romanian violinist, 83
- March 23 – Blanche Thebom, 91, American mezzo-soprano
- April 1 – Morag Beaton, 83, Scottish-Australian soprano
- April 10 – William Walker, 78, American baritone and General Director of the Fort Worth Opera
- April 27 – Morris Pert, Scottish percussionist, pianist and composer, 62
- April 29 – Johannes Fritsch, German composer, 68
- May 5 – Giulietta Simionato, Italian operatic mezzo-soprano, 99
- May 17 – Yvonne Loriod, French pianist, teacher, and composer, 86
- May 24 – Anneliese Rothenberger, 83, German soprano
- May 25 – Siphiwo Ntshebe, South African operatic tenor, 35 (meningitis)
- June 2 – Giuseppe Taddei, Italian operatic baritone, 93
- June 5 – Arne Nordheim, Norwegian composer, 78
- June 12 – Fuat Mansurov, Russian conductor, 82
- June 14 – Giacinto Prandelli, Italian operatic tenor, 96
- June 18 – Kalmen Opperman, American clarinetist, teacher, conductor and instrument maker, 90
- July 1 – John Paynter, British composer and music educator, 78
- July 5 – Cesare Siepi, 87, Italian bass
- July 12 – John Douglas, American conductor, voice teacher and accompanist, 54 (melanoma)
- July 14 – Sir Charles Mackerras, Australian conductor, 84
- July 15 – Luo Pinchao, Chinese opera singer, 98
- June 16 – Maureen Forrester, 79, Canadian contralto
- July 21 – Anthony Rolfe Johnson, British tenor, 69
- August 6 – Cacilda Borges Barbosa, Brazilian pianist, conductor and composer, 96
- September 11 – Herbert Grossman, American conductor, 83
- September 12 – Charles Ansbacher, American conductor, 67
- September 19 – László Polgár, Hungarian operatic bass, 63
- September 21 – Geoffrey Burgon, British film and TV score composer, 69
- September 28 – Dolores Wilson, American operatic soprano, 82
- October 10
  - Alison Stephens, English mandolin player, 40 (cervical cancer)
  - Joan Sutherland, Australian operatic soprano, 83
- October 30 – Morris Pert, Scottish composer, drummer /percussionist and pianist, 62
- November 2 – Rudolf Barshai, Russian violist and composer, 86
- November 5 – Shirley Verrett, American mezzo-soprano, 79
- November 12 – Henryk Górecki, Polish composer, 74
- November 30 – Peter Hofmann, German operatic tenor, 66
- December 6 – Hugues Cuénod, Swiss operatic tenor, 108
- December 7 – Sergiu Luca, Romanian violinist, 67
- December 15 – Hilde Rössel-Majdan, Austrian operatic contralto, 89
- December 16 – Richard Adeney, British flautist, 90

== Major awards ==
=== Pulitzer Prize in Music ===
- Jennifer Higdon – Violin Concerto

=== Classical Brits ===
- Composer of the Year – Thomas Adès
- Male Artist of the Year – Vasily Petrenko
- Female Artist Of The Year – Angela Gheorghiu
- Critics' Award – Antonio Pappano

=== Grammy Awards ===
- See 52nd Grammy Awards

== Composer's Guild Grand Prize ==
- Greg Danner

== See also ==
- 2010 in opera
