= 2010 in music =

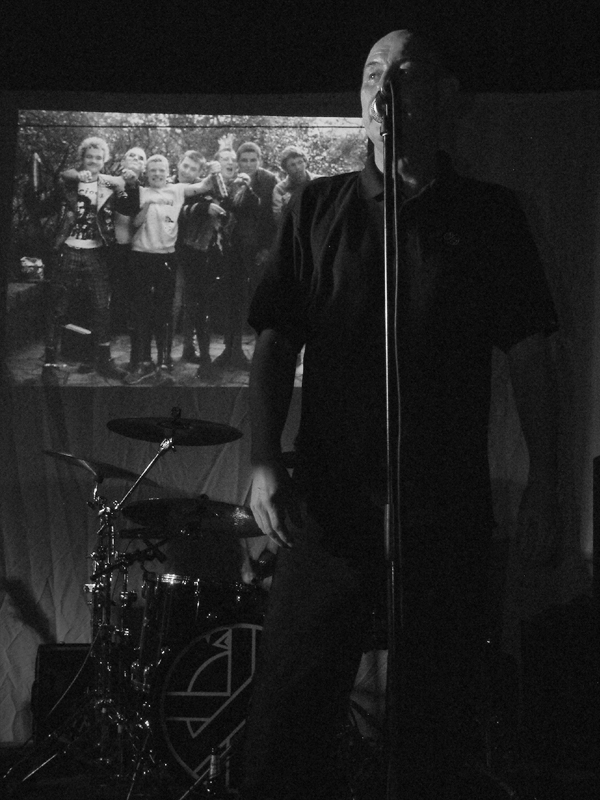
Steve Ignorant and the last Supper playing Crass songs live at Cafe ExZess, Frankfurt / Main - germany Sunday 17. November 2010.

This topic covers notable events and articles related to 2010 in music.

== Specific locations ==
- 2010 in American music
- 2010 in Asian music
- 2010 in Australian music
- 2010 in British music
- 2010 in Canadian music
- 2010 in European music (Continental Europe)
- 2010 in Irish music
- 2010 in Japanese music
- 2010 in New Zealand music
- 2010 in Norwegian music
- 2010 in Philippine music
- 2010 in Scandinavian music
- 2010 in Swedish music
- 2010 in South Korean music

== Specific genres ==
- 2010 in alternative rock
- 2010 in classical music
- 2010 in country music
- 2010 in heavy metal music
- 2010 in hip-hop
- 2010 in jazz
- 2010 in Latin music
- 2010 in opera
- 2010 in progressive rock

== Albums released ==
- List of 2010 albums

== Deaths ==
January

- 8 – Otmar Suitner (87), Austrian conductor
- 10 – Dick Johnson (84), American big band clarinetist
- 13
  - Teddy Pendergrass (59), American R&B singer
  - Jay Reatard (29), American indie rock singer
- 18 – Kate McGarrigle (63), Canadian folk singer (Kate & Anna McGarrigle)
- 26 – Dag Frøland (64), Norwegian comedian, singer and variety artist

February

- 6 – John Dankworth (82), English jazz saxophonist, clarinetist and composer
- 13 – Dale Hawkins (73), American rockabilly singer
- 14 – Doug Fieger (54), American power pop singer and guitarist (The Knack)
- 23 – Chilly B (47), American electro rapper (Newcleus)
- 27 – Larry Cassidy (56), British post-punk singer and guitarist (Section 25)

March

- 4 – Amalie Christie (96), Norwegian pianist
- 6 – Mark Linkous (47), American alternative rock singer (Sparklehorse)
- 7 – Tony Campise (67), American jazz saxophonist
- 17 – Alex Chilton (59), American power pop singer (The Box Tops, Big Star)
- 23 – Marva Wright (62), American blues and jazz singer
- 28 – Herb Ellis (88), American jazz guitarist

April

- 8 – Malcolm McLaren (64), British new wave musician and rock manager
- 13 – Steve Reid (66), American jazz drummer
- 14 – Peter Steele (48), American heavy metal singer (Type O Negative)
- 18 – Devon Clifford (30), Canadian indie rock drummer (You Say Party)
- 19 – Guru (43), American rapper (Gang Starr)
- 21 – Gustav Lorentzen (62), Norwegian folk singer and entertainer in Knutsen & Ludvigsen (Cardiac arrest)
- 29 – Johannes Fritsch (68), German composer and violist

May

- 5 – Alfons Kontarsky (77), German pianist
- 9 – Lena Horne (92), American jazz singer
- 16
  - Ronnie James Dio (67), American heavy metal singer (Elf, Rainbow, Black Sabbath, Dio, Heaven & Hell)
  - Hank Jones (91), American jazz pianist, bandleader, arranger, and composer
- 23 – Billy Francis (68), American rock keyboardist (Dr. Hook & the Medicine Show)
- 24 – Paul Gray (38), bassist for Slipknot
- 30 – Kristian Bergheim (83), Norwegian jazz saxophonist

June

- 5 – Arne Nordheim (78), Norwegian composer
- 6 – Marvin Isley (56), American R&B bassist (The Isley Brothers)
- 7 – Stuart Cable (40), British alternative rock drummer (Stereophonics)
- 16 – Garry Shider (56), American funk guitarist (Parliament-Funkadelic)
- 21
  - Larry Jon Wilson (69), American country singer
  - Chris Sievey (54), British singer and comedian
- 23 – Pete Quaife (68), British rock bassist (The Kinks)
- 24 – Fred Anderson (81), American jazz tenor saxophonist

July

- 10 – Sugar Minott (54), Jamaican reggae singer
- 12 – Tuli Kupferberg (80), American psychedelic musician and poet (The Fugs)
- 15 – Knut Stensholm (56), Norwegian drummer (Sambandet)
- 19 – Andy Hummel (59), American power pop bassist (Big Star)
- 23 – Willy Bakken (59), Norwegian guitarist and popular culture writer
- 26 – Al Goodman (67), American R&B singer (Ray, Goodman & Brown)

August

- 3 – Bobby Hebb (72), American singer-songwriter and musician
- 6
  - Catfish Collins (66), American funk guitarist (The J.B.'s, Parliament-Funkadelic)
  - Chris Dedrick (63), American sunshine pop singer, guitarist and arranger (The Free Design)
- 14 – Abbey Lincoln (80), American jazz singer
- 19 – Michael Been (60), American alternative rock singer and bassist (The Call)

September

- 3 – Mike Edwards (62), American rock cellist (Electric Light Orchestra)
- 13 – Jarosław Kukulski (66), Polish composer

October

- 5 – Jack Berntsen (69), Norwegian philologist, songwriter and folk singer
- 10 – Solomon Burke (70), American R&B singer
- 16 – Eyedea (28), American rapper (Eyedea & Abilities)
- 20 – Ari Up (48), British post-punk singer (The Slits)
- 25 – Gregory Isaacs (59), Jamaican reggae singer

November

- 25 – Peter Christopherson (55), British industrial musician (Throbbing Gristle, Psychic TV, Coil)

December

- 9 – James Moody (85), American jazz saxophonist
- 17 – Captain Beefheart (69), American blues singer
- 26 – Teena Marie (54), American R&B singer and bassist.
- 28 – Billy Taylor (89), American jazz pianist
- 30 – Bobby Farrell (61), Aruban singer (Boney M)

== Songs released in 2010 ==
Date	Song	Artist
January 18	Baby	Justin Bieber
January 18	If We Ever Meet Again	Timbaland featuring Katy Perry
February 19	Blah Blah Blah	Kesha featuring 3OH!3
February 27	We No Speak Americano	Yolanda Be Cool and DCUP
March 9	Watagatapitusberry	Pitbull featuring Sensato del Patio, Black Point, Lil Jon and El Cata
March 22	OMG	Usher featuring will.i.am
April 13	Like a G6	Far East Movement featuring The Cataracs and Dev
April 29	Not Afraid	Eminem
May 7	California Gurls	Katy Perry featuring Snoop Dogg
May 11	If I Had You	Adam Lambert
May 14	Your Love Is My Drug	Kesha
May 30 (US only)	Dynamite	Taio Cruz
June 25	DJ Got Us Fallin' in Love	Usher featuring Pitbull
June 25	Love the Way You Lie	Eminem and Rihanna
June 28	Club Can't Handle Me	Flo Rida featuring David Guetta
July 13	Take It Off	Kesha
July 23	Teenage Dream	Katy Perry
August 23 (UK only)	Dynamite	Taio Cruz
September 14	Hey Baby (Drop It to the Floor)	Pitbull featuring T-Pain
September 14	Pumped Up Kicks	Foster the People
October 5	Raise Your Glass	Pink
October 22	We R Who We R	Kesha
October 25	No Love	Eminem featuring Lil Wayne
October 25	Yeah 3x	Chris Brown
October 26	Firework	Katy Perry
October 26	The Show Goes On	Lupe Fiasco
October 26	Whip My Hair	Willow Smith
October 29	Rocketeer	Far East Movement featuring Ryan Tedder
November 5	The Time (Dirty Bit)	The Black Eyed Peas
November 29 (UK only)	Rolling in the Deep	Adele

== Musical films ==
- Nodame Cantabile: The Movie II

== See also ==
- Timeline of musical events
- 2010 in television
