= 2010 in Asian music =

== Events ==
- March 5–7 – The 6th Jakarta International Java Jazz Festival opens in Jakarta.
- March 22 – Daniel Barenboim is awarded the Otto Hahn Peace Medal for his work with the West-Eastern Divan Orchestra.
- August 15 – "Jiyo Utho Bado Jeeto", written by musician A. R. Rahman, is approved as the official anthem of the 2010 Commonwealth Games.
- October 3 – At the opening ceremony of the Commonwealth Games in Delhi, India, musical performers include:
  - Drummers from Kerala, Manipur, Karnataka, Orissa, Punjab and Meghalaya, including 7-year-old tabla prodigy Keshav.
  - Hariharan
  - Dancers including Birju Maharaj, Rajkumar Singhajit Singh, Saroja Vaidyanathan, Sonal Mansingh and Bharati Shivaji

== Albums ==
- Betzefer – Freedom to the Slave Makers (Israel)
- Ei Jibon Nohoi Xuna Bondhu (compilation album; India)
- Jasbir Jassi – Jassi – Back with a Bang (India)
- Kaela Kimura – 5 Years (Japan)
- Tarkan – Adımı Kalbine Yaz (Turkey)
- Haifa Wehbe – Baby Haifa (Lebanon)
- Younha – Hitotsu Sora no Shita (South Korea)

== Classical ==
- Mehdi Hosseini
  - Taleshi Hava, for solo violin and bassoon
  - An Unfinished Draft, for flute, clarinet, piano, violin, violoncello and baritone
  - Pause, for flute, clarinet, piano, violin, violoncello and tubular bells

== Opera ==
- The Child Dreams, by Gil Shohat
- Madame White Snake, with music by Zhou Long and libretto by Cerise Lim Jacobs

== Deaths ==
- January 7 – Kamal Mahsud, Pakistani Pashto language folk singer (gas leak)
- January 11 – Georgy Garanian, Armenian-Russian saxophonist, bandleader, and composer, 75
- March 22 – Yanie, Malaysian singer
- April 22 – Fred Panopio, Filipino folk singer, 71
- June 12 – Fuat Mansurov, Russian conductor, 82
- July 15 – Luo Pinchao, Chinese opera singer, 98
- November 2
  - Rudolf Barshai, Russian violist and composer, 86
  - Kalim Sharafi, Bangladeshi singer, 85

== See also ==
- 2010 in music
- 2010 in Japanese music
- 2010 in South Korean music
- List of 2010 albums
