= Karin Shifrin =

Israeli mezzo-soprano opera singer

- קארין שיפרין
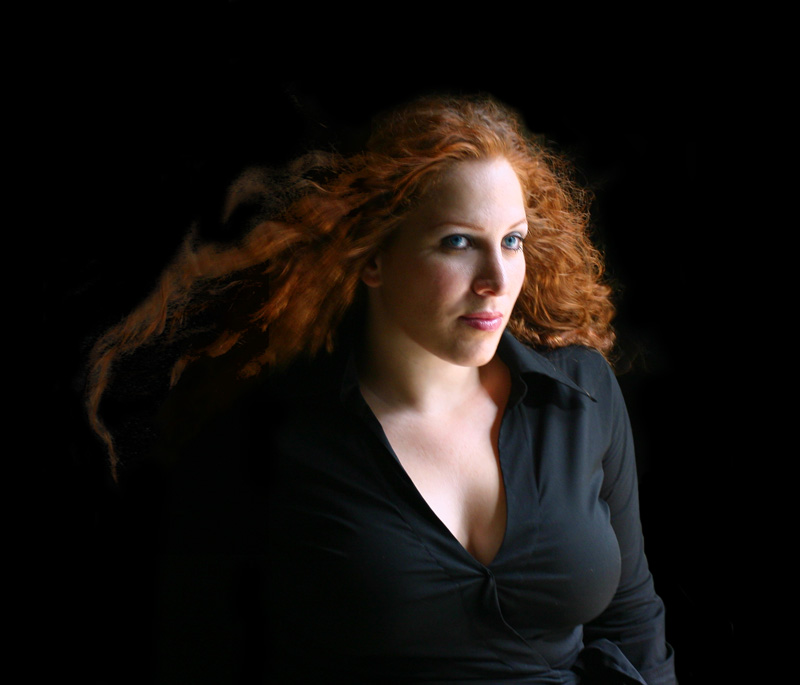
- Karin Shifrin
- Born: Jerusalem, Israel
- Education: Buchmann-Mehta School of Music, Tel Aviv University
- Occupation: Opera singer (mezzo-soprano)
- Awards: Buchman-Mehta Music Academy vocal competition; Internationaler Hilde Zadek Gesangswettbewerb; International Hans Gabor Belvedere Gesangswettbewerb; Iris Adami Corradetti Lyrical International Competition; Concours international de chant de Clermont-Ferrand; The Montserrat Caballe International Competition
- Musical career
- Genres: Opera
- Instrument: Vocals

Karin Shifrin (Hebrew: קארין שיפרין; born in Jerusalem) is an Israeli mezzo-soprano opera singer. She regularly performs in Israel and Europe. Since the age of 24, she sang in concerts with the Israel Philharmonic Orchestra, and with the Teatro Comunale di Bologna orchestra, as well as other orchestras. Shifrin has been performing in the Israeli opera since 2005.

== Career ==
Shifrin graduated her B.Mus. degree (with honors) in the Buchmann-Mehta Music Academy at the Tel-Aviv University. Her vocal instructors were Tamar Rachum (Israel), Kammersängerin Hilde Zadek (Austria) and Patricia McCaffrey (New York). Shifrin's debut with the Israeli Opera was at the age of 25.

Among the roles she performed:

- "'Max and Moritz" (conducted by Gil Shohat)
- The second Lady in The Magic Flute (conducted by Dan Ettinger)
- The Woman Who Comforts at the world premiere of the contemporary opera adaptation to a Hanoch Levin play, The Child Dreams
- Rossini's Cenerentola in a special production
- Mrs. Smith, the leading role in a contemporary opera based upon Eugène Ionesco's "The Bald Soprano”

=== International performances ===
Some of Shifrin's international performances:

- Israeli Philharmonic Orchestra, The Marriage of Figaro (as Marcellina) and Beethoven's 9th Symphony (soloist) (conducted by Zubin Mehta)
- Various recitals in Germany and Britain
- "Concert for peace" – a duo concert with a Palestinian singer at the "Il Violino Magico" festival in Venice, Italy
- "Concert For Life And Peace" – which took place in Rome, Beth-Lechem and Jerusalem, with the Teatro Comunale di Bologna Orchestra (conducted by Shlomo Mintz)
- Several concerts in Poland in commemoration of the Holocaust victims (conducted by Omer Welber)
- The Marschallin in Der Rosenkavalier and the title role in Arabella in Sigriswil, Bern and Bad Ragaz, Switzerland (Conducted by Andsreas Kowalewitz)
- Rosina in The Barber of Seville with the National Symphony Orchestra of Kazakhstan (conducted by Vag Papian)
- Romeo in I Capuletti ed I Montechi with the Aso Orchestra Boston (conducted by Mark Swanson)

=== Awards ===
Some of the Awards Shifrin has received over her career include:

- 2002 – Buchman – Mehta music academy vocal competition (Israel) – Finalist and 2nd-place winner
- 2003 – Buchman – Mehta music academy vocal competition (Israel) – Finalist and 2nd-place winner
- 2003 – Internationaler Hilde Zadek Gesangswettbewerb (Austria) – Finalist and 4th-place winner
- 2004 – International Hans Gabor Belvedere Gesangswettbewerb (Austria) – Semi-Finalist and special award winner
- 2008 – Iris Adami Corradetti Lyrical International Competition (Italy) – Semi Finalist
- 2009 – Concours international de chant de Clermont-Ferrand (France) – Semi Finalist
- 2011– The Montserrat caballe international competition (Spain) – Semi Finalist

In addition, she has obtained the "Hildegard Zadek Stiftung", the "AICF" and the "Opernwerkstatt Verena Keller" scholarships for outstanding vocal, musical and creative achievements.

=== Australian/New Zealand tour ===
In 2012, Karin was invited by the Israeli Embassy in Australia to perform a special composition by Kobi Oshrat, in Melbourne with the Orchestra Victoria, in honour of Irena Sendler, a catholic Polish who saved Jews' lives during WWII. The New Zealand tour following that invitation included concerts in Wellington.

== Diva De Lai ==
Since 2012, Karin has been the leading singer for international rock act Diva De Lai. The band's debut album, "Dylan at the Opera" (released October 2013) featured twelve Bob Dylan songs, reworked into various rock/opera styles.

The band's first music video, a cover of Dylan's "Senor (Tales of Yankee Power)" (off his 1978's Street Legal) was also made available online in October 2013.

== Sources ==
- Israeli Opera, Artist's biography
- Messer, Tova, "Mozart unites nations", Jerusalem Post, 26 December 2005
- "The Child Dreams". האופרה הישראלית תל-אביב - יפו. 18 January 2010.
