= 2010 in South Korean music =

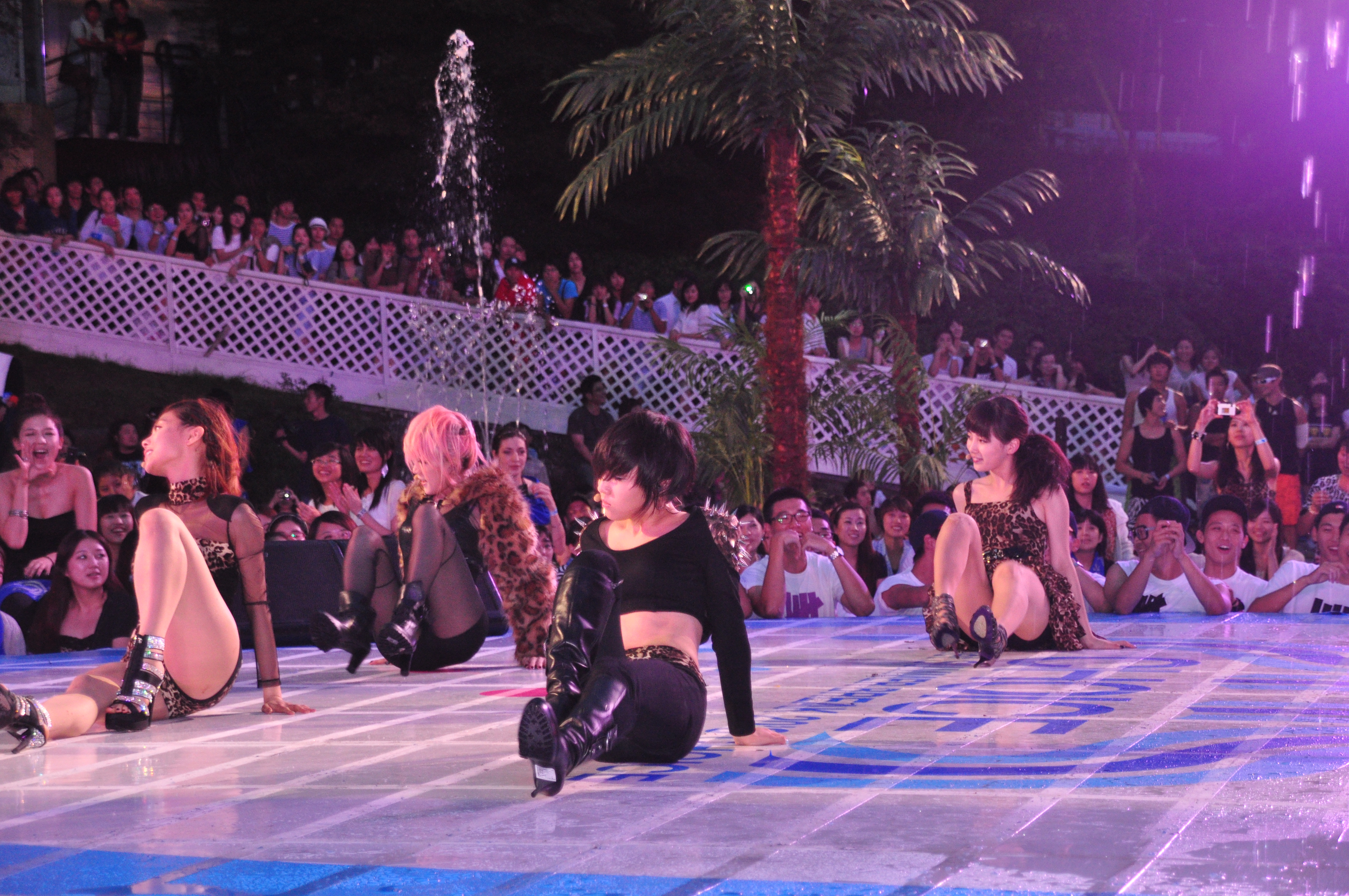
Miss A in Mnet 20's Choice Awards

The following is a list of notable events and releases that happened in 2010 in music in South Korea.

== Debuting and disbanded in 2010 ==
=== Debuting groups ===
- ...Whatever That Means
- The Boss
- CNBLUE
- Coed School
- DMTN
- Eastern Sidekick
- F.Cuz
- GD & TOP
- Girl's Day
- GP Basic
- Idiotape
- Infinite
- JYJ
- Led Apple
- Miss A
- Nine Muses
- One Way
- Orange Caramel
- Raspberry Field
- Rooftop Moonlight
- Rhythm Power
- Standing Egg
- Sistar
- Teen Top
- The Boss
- The Koxx
- Touch
- ZE:A

=== Solo debuts ===
- The Black Skirts
- Cha Cha Malone
- Choi Jung-in
- Chun Myung-hoon
- Crucial Star
- Gilme
- G.NA
- Huh Gak
- Hyuna
- Jambinai
- Jay Park
- John Park
- JeA
- Kim Junsu
- Lady Jane
- Okasian
- Rumble Fish
- Soy Kim
- Swings
- Yun Seok-cheol

=== Disbanded groups ===
- Rumble Fish
- Tin Tin Five
- Uptown

== Releases in 2010 ==
=== First quarter ===
==== January ====
Date	Title	Artist	Genre(s)
5	Jeong (정)(情)	Kim Yeon-woo	Ballad, Dance
7	Nativity	ZE:A	Dance-pop
13	One Day (하루가)	KCM	R&B, Ballad
14	Bluetory	CNBLUE	K-pop, pop rock
19	Shadow (Repackage)	Lee Seung-gi	K-pop
19	New Day	Daybreak	Rock
21	Can't Let You Go Even If I Die	2AM	Ballad
25	Oh!	Girls' Generation	K-pop
28	The Violet Album	Apollo 18	Rock

==== February ====
Date	Title	Artist	Genre(s)
3	Only One	U-KISS	Dance-pop
4	Reunion (재회)	Min Kyung-hoon	Ballad
4	Special Edition	Hong Kyung-min	Pop rock
17	Lupin	Kara	Dance-pop
18	An Jin Kyoung 1st Mini Album	Ahn Jin Kyung	K-pop, Pop
23	Breaking Heart	T-ara	K-pop

==== March ====
Date	Title	Artist	Genre(s)
1	Shock of the New Era	BEAST	K-pop
9	Epilogue	Epik High	Alternative hip hop
11	No One	F.Cuz	K-pop, Dance-pop, R&B, hip hop
16	I Was Wrong	2AM	K-pop
17	Run Devil Run	Girls' Generation	K-pop
18	Supremier	Supreme Team	K-pop
18	Scream Op. 1	Lee Joo-min	K-pop
18	Rock 'n' Roll Licence	The RockTigers	Rockabilly

=== Second quarter ===
==== April ====
Date	Title	Artist	Genre(s)
1	Secret Time	Secret	K-pop
7	Back to the Basic	Bi Rain	K-pop
12	H-Logic	Lee Hyori	K-pop
19	Don't Stop Can't Stop	2PM	K-pop, dance, hip-hop
20	Hwangoltaltae (환골탈태)	Norazo	K-pop, trot, rock
22	The First EP	10cm	K-pop, Acoustic folk

==== May ====
Date	Title	Artist	Genre(s)
4	Nu ABO	f(x)	K-pop, R&B, dance, electronica
6	Innocence	Davichi	pop, R&B
6	Just Beginning	Seo In Guk	pop, R&B
11	Re Birthday	J'Kyun	Hip hop
13	Bonamana	Super Junior	K-pop, R&B, dance, electronica
13	6th Part 2 'Candy Train'	Lyn	K-pop, R&B, dance, electronica
14	Ambitious	NS Yoon-G	K-pop, dance
15	2 Different Tears	Wonder Girls	K-pop, dance
17	Y	MBLAQ	K-pop
19	Bluelove	CNBLUE	K-pop pop rock
19	Hit Your Heart	4Minute	K-pop
19	Groove Official	Sultan of the Disco	Disco
24	Destination	SS501	K-pop, R&B, dance, electronica
27	Hwayobi	Hwayobi	K-pop, R&B

==== June ====
Date	Title	Artist	Genre(s)
1	Lov-Elly	Seo In-young	K-pop
3	Nagging	IU, Lim Seul-ong	K-pop, Pop, Ballad
3	Spin Off (Repackage)	Supreme Team	K-pop
9	First Invasion	Infinite	K-pop
10	Koyote Ugly	Koyote	K-pop
14	This Moment	Monni	Rock
17	The First Mini Album	Orange Caramel	K-pop
30	A-Live Take Out Vol. 1 'Playground and Diary'	Monni	Rock

=== Third quarter ===
==== July ====
Date	Title	Artist	Genre(s)
1	Bad But Good	Miss A	K-pop
1	Solar	Taeyang	K-pop
8	The Queen	Son Dam Bi	K-pop
8	NARSHA	Narsha	K-pop
9	Come into the World	Teen Top	K-pop
9	Girl's Day Party #1	Girl's Day	K-pop
14	Draw G's First Breath	G.NA	K-pop
19	Lucifer	Shinee	K-pop
21	Digital Bounce	SE7EN	K-pop
29	Look at	Chae Yeon	K-pop
29	풍류	DJ DOC	K-pop

==== August ====
Date	Title	Artist	Genre(s)
5	Hurricane Venus	BoA	K-pop
5	Aurora	Daybreak	Rock
10	Aegiya	Seo In Guk	pop, R&B
10	The Paragon of Animals	Crash	Thrash rock
12	A	Rainbow	K-pop
12	Madonna	Secret	K-pop
12	Let’s Have A Party	Nine Muses	K-pop
17	Time To Shine	Supernova	K-pop
17	Same Girl	Na Yoon-sun	Jazz
25	Beautiful Journey	F.T. Island	K-pop, pop-rock
26	Be The Voice	Ahn Jin Kyung	K-pop, Pop

==== September ====
Date	Title	Artist	Genre(s)
3	The Classic	Brave Brothers	Hip hop
9	To Anyone	2NE1	K-pop, Pop, Dance-pop, Electropop, Synthpop, R&B, Hip hop
13	Everybody Ready?	San E	K-pop
27	Step Up	Miss A	K-pop
29	Solista Part 1	Kim Bum-soo	K-pop
30	Mastermind	BEAST	K-pop
30	《사랑 (Love)》	Lee Juck	K-pop

=== Fourth quarter ===
==== October ====
Date	Title	Artist	Genre(s)
4	Break Time	U-KISS	Dance-pop
4	Hello	SHINee	K-pop, dance-pop, R&B
7	The Memory	Park Yong-ha	K-pop
8	Step 2/4	Gain	K-pop
11	Still 02:00PM	2PM	K-pop
14	The Beginning	JYJ	K-pop
14	A Woman Like Me	Hwayobi	K-pop, R&B
19	SG Wannabe 7 Part.I	SG Wannabe	K-pop
19	Welcome to the Jungle	Chun Myung-hoon	K-pop
20	Mach	Rainbow	K-pop
20	PsyFive	Psy	K-pop
21	Time To Fly High	NS Yoon-G	K-pop, dance
26	Saint o'Clock	2AM	Ballad
27	Hoot	Girls' Generation	K-pop
28	Something That Is Cheerful and Fresh	Coed School	K-pop
29	Girl’s Day Party #2	Girl's Day	K-pop, dance

==== November ====
Date	Title	Artist	Genre(s)
9	Lights Go On Again	BEAST	K-pop
10	Jumping	Kara	Dance-pop
11	The Persistence of Memory	Ha Soo-bin	Dance-pop
18	The Second Mini Album	Orange Caramel	K-pop
18	Gorgeous	F.Cuz	K-pop
20	Omega Op. 2	Lee Joo-min	K-pop
25	Browneyed Soul	Brown Eyed Soul	K-pop, R&B
29	Miss You	S.M. THE BALLAD	K-pop

==== December ====
Date	Title	Artist	Genre(s)
1	Temptastic	T-ara	Dance-pop
7	Happy Pledis 1st Album	After School	Christmas
9	REAL	IU	K-pop
9	Fall In...	Wax	R&B, Ballad
21	My Story	BEAST	K-pop
24	GD & TOP	GD & TOP	Dance-pop

== Deaths ==
- Park Yong-ha, 32, actor and singer
- Choi Jin-young, 39, actor and singer

== See also ==
- 2010 in South Korea
- List of South Korean films of 2010
