= Dan Ettinger =

- דן אטינגר
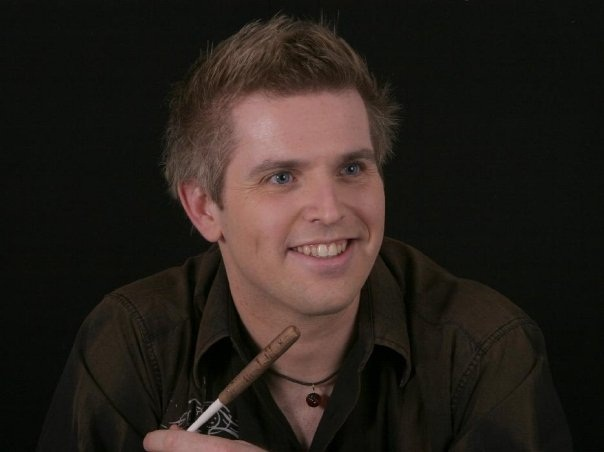
- Born: 1971 (age 54–55)
- Occupations: Conductor, opera singer (baritone), pianist
- Website: https://danettinger.com/

Dan Ettinger (Hebrew: דן אטינגר; born 1971) is an Israeli conductor, opera singer and pianist.

== Biography ==
Ettinger is descended from Romanian immigrants to Israel, as his father and grandmother are Holocaust survivors. He grew up in the Tel Aviv suburb of Holon. Ettinger began taking piano lessons at the age of five. He received his musical training at the Thelma Yellin High School for the Arts in Givatayim. Ettinger made a career as a baritone at the Israeli Opera in Tel Aviv, until he was offered a position as choir director. From 2002 to 2003, he was co-principal guest conductor of the Jerusalem Symphony Orchestra and conducted works such as Berlioz Symphonie fantastique, Mahler's 4th Symphony and Mozart's Requiem.

From 2003 to 2009, Ettinger was a conducting assistant to Daniel Barenboim and Kapellmeister at the Staatsoper Unter den Linden in Berlin. He was Generalmusikdirektor of the Mannheim National Theatre from 2009 to 2016.

Ettinger has served as chief conductor of the Israel Symphony Orchestra Rishon LeZion and music director of the Israeli Opera in Tel Aviv, with an initial tenure in the posts from 2005 to 2014, and a second, current tenure beginning in 2018. He became principal conductor of the Stuttgart Philharmonic Orchestra in 2015. His current Stuttgart contract is through 2023. He made numerous opera guest performances from Covent Garden in London to the Vienna State Opera to the Metropolitan Opera in New York. In June 2021, the Teatro di San Carlo announced the appointment of Ettinger as its next music director, effective 1 January 2023.

Cultural offices
Preceded by Mendi Rodan	Music Director, Israel Symphony Orchestra Rishon LeZion; 2005-2014	Succeeded by James Judd
Preceded by Axel Kober	Generalmusikdirektor, Mannheim National Theatre; 2009–2016	Succeeded by Alexander Soddy
Preceded by Daniel Harding	Chief Conductor, Tokyo Philharmonic Orchestra; 2010–2015	Succeeded by Andrea Battistoni
Preceded by Gabriel Feltz	Chief Conductor, Stuttgarter Philharmoniker; 2015–present	Succeeded by incumbent
Preceded by Daniel Oren	Music Director, Israeli Opera; 2018–present	Succeeded by incumbent
Preceded by James Judd	Music Director, Israel Symphony Orchestra Rishon LeZion; 2018–present	Succeeded by incumbent
