= Stuttgarter Philharmoniker =

German orchestra

- Orchestra
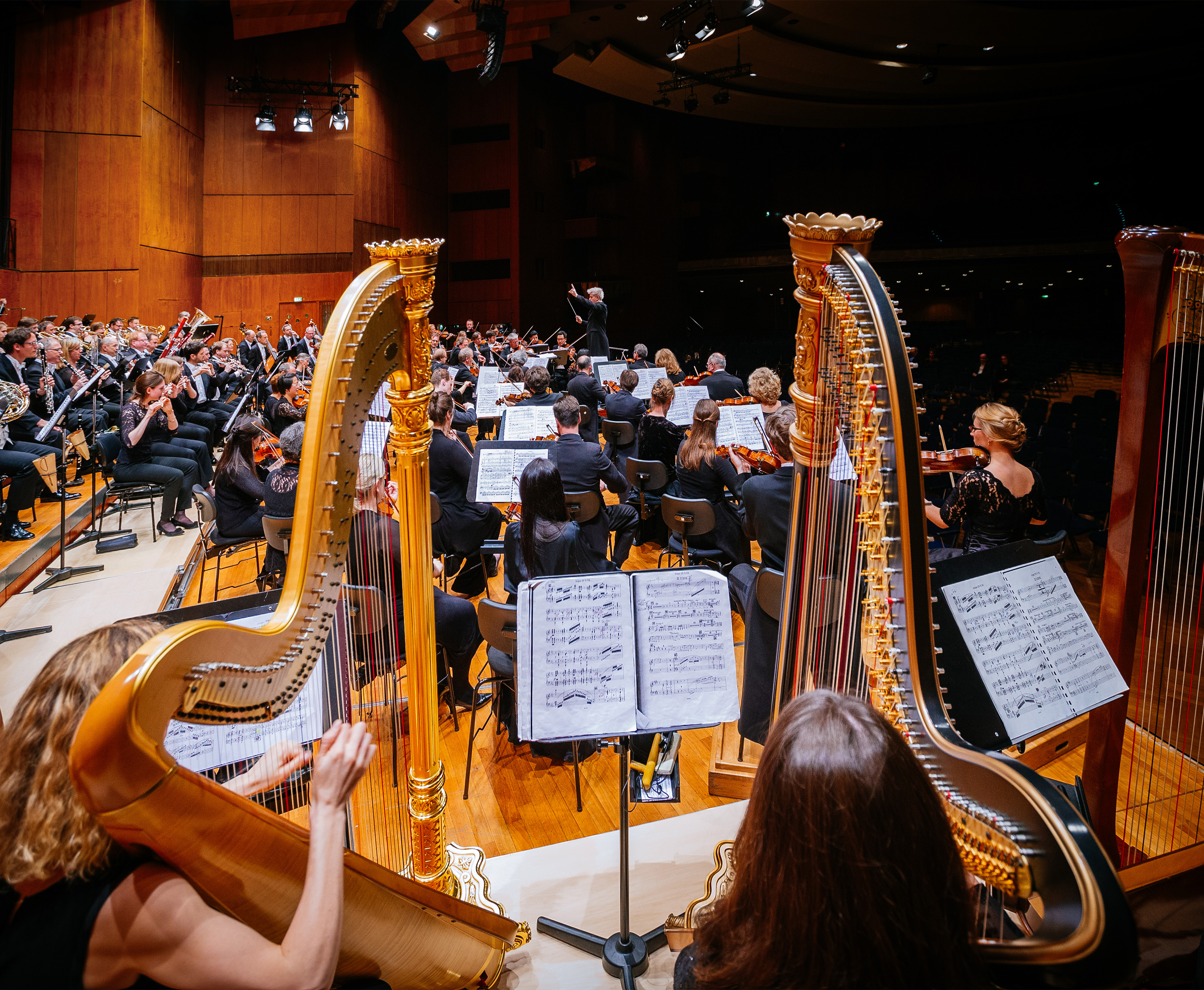
- Stuttgarter Philharmoniker with GMD Dan Ettinger
- Former name: Philharmonisches Orchester Suttgart
- Founded: 1924
- Location: Stuttgart, Germany
- Principal conductor: Dan Ettinger
- Website: www.stuttgarter-philharmoniker.de

The Stuttgarter Philharmoniker (Stuttgart Philharmonic) is the symphony orchestra of Stuttgart, the capital of Baden-Württemberg, Germany. Founded in 1924, they play regular concert series including youth concerts in Stuttgart, as well as guest concerts internationally.

== History ==
=== Foundation ===
The orchestra was founded as Philharmonisches Orchester Stuttgart (Philharmonic Orchestra Stuttgart) in September 1924 when the orchestra played a 1. Werbe-Concert (First Promotion Concert). A rapid artistic development made it possible to engage conductors and soloists such as Leo Blech, Carl Flesch, Hans Knappertsbusch, Hermann Abendroth, Fritz Kreisler, Carl Schuricht and Felix Weingartner. In 1933, under the Nazi regime, Jewish and most foreign musicians were dismissed, and the orchestra was divided: part of the musicians joined the orchestra of the Reichssender Stuttgart broadcaster, while others continued as "Landesorchester Gau Württemberg-Hohenzollern".

=== After 1945 ===
After the end of World War II, most members of the former philharmonic orchestra reunited under the name Stuttgarter Philharmoniker. Principal conductors from 1949 to 1972 included Hermann Hildebrandt, Willem van Hoogstraten, Hans Hörner, Antonio de Almeida and Alexander Paulmüller. Hans Zanotelli was artistic director from 1972 to 1985, and shaped to orchestra into a powerful group.

In 1976, Stuttgart, the capital of Baden-Württemberg, took over the orchestra, with Wolf-Dieter Hauschild as principal conductor from 1985 to 1991. Carlos Kalmar continued the tradition from 1991 to 1995. Jörg-Peter Weigle was Generalmusikdirektor (GMD) from 1995 to 2002. Walter Weller, who had been closely associated with the orchestra for many years, was appointed Honorary Conductor in October 2003.

From September 2004 to 2013, Gabriel Feltz was conductor of the Stuttgarter Philharmoniker and GMD of Stuttgart. The orchestra was awarded the Prix Rachmaninoff in 2007, in recognition of the most extensive performance cycle of Rachmaninoff's works in German-speaking countries, with all symphonies, piano concertos and other orchestral works. In the 2015/16 season, Dan Ettinger succeeded Feltz in the positions. He conducted a concert performance of Puccini's Turandot with international stars, the Czech Philharmonic Choir Brno and the Aurelius Sängerknaben. Ettinger left the orchestra after the 2023/24 season.

== Program ==
In addition to several concert series in its home town, the Stuttgarter Philharmoniker regularly give guest performances every year in Germany and abroad. Tours have taken the orchestra to the U.S., Japan, South America, the China and Mexico. In recent years, they toured to Milan, Salzburg, Lucerne, Zürich and Antwerp. Since 2013, the Stuttgarter Philharmoniker have been the festival orchestra of the Opernfestspiele Heidenheim, directed by Marcus Bosch.

== Recordings ==
The orchestra recorded for broadcasts and CDs, including Rachmaninoff's Der Fels and Toteninsel, Scriabin's Prométhée and Mahler's Symphonies Nos 1 and 3 to 7. They played Ravel's La valse for DVD. In 2013, they recorded the world premiere recording of the complete ballet music from Respighi's Belkis, Regina di Saba. They released a recording of Beethoven's Symphonies No. 3 and 5.
