= 2010 in rock music =

This article summarizes the events related to rock music for the year of 2010.

== Notable events ==
=== January ===
- Nickelback finds crossover success with their song "Never Gonna Be Alone", which peaks at number 58 on the all-format US Billboard Hot 100 chart.
- Three Days Grace's single "Break" continues its stay at the top of the Billboard Mainstream Rock Songs chart, that started in December 2009, and continues into February, spanning 11 consecutive weeks. The song also finds cross-over success, peaking at number 73 on the Billboard US all-format Hot 100 songs chart.
- You Me at Six release their second studio album, Hold Me Down. It peaks at number 5 on the UK albums chart and was certified gold.
- Spoon releases their seventh studio album, Transference. It debuts at number 4 on the Billboard, selling 53,000 copies in its opening week.

=== February ===
- Alice in Chains single "Your Decision" tops the Billboard Mainstream Rock chart, and stays there for 8 consecutive weeks.
- Rob Zombie releases his fourth studio album, Hellbilly Deluxe 2. It opens at number 8 on the Billboard 200, selling 49,000 copies. This is half as much as his prior album, Educated Horses, which sold 108,000 copies in its first week in 2006.
- Alkaline Trio releases their seventh studio album, This Addiction. It debuts just outside of the top 10 of the Billboard 200, charting at number 11 with 26,000 copies sold. It is the second highest debut of the week, and the career highest debut for the band.

=== March ===
- Almost Alice, a concept album of music inspired by Tim Burton's 2010 film Alice in Wonderland, is released. It features contribution from various artists, including many rock bands, including Shinedown, Franz Ferdinand, They Might Be Giants, and All Time Low. The album debuts at number 5 on the Billboard 200, selling 58,000 copies.
- Lifehouse releases their fifth studio album, Smoke and Mirrors. It debuts at number 6 on the Billboard 200 chart, selling 56,000 copies.
- Valleys of Neptune, a collection of previously unreleased versions of songs recorded by Jimi Hendrix, is released. The release is a collection of songs recorded by Hendrix in early 1969 after the release of Electric Ladyland. It debuts at number 4 on the Billboard 200 chart.
- The Edge, a compilation of rock songs primarily originating from the 2000s, is released. It contains popular singles from 24 rock bands, including Evanescence, Staind, Chevelle, Sum 41, Alien Ant Farm, Godsmack, and Panic at the Disco. It debuts at number 4 on the Billboard 200, selling 53,000 copies in its opening week.
- Slash releases his first solo album, Slash. It is the highest debut of the week on the Billboard 200, charting at number 3 and selling 60,000 copies.

=== April ===
- Godsmack single "Cryin' Like A Bitch" tops the Billboard Mainstream Rock chart for 5 weeks.
- Coheed and Cambria release their fifth studio album, Year of the Black Rainbow. It debuts at number 5 on the Billboard 200 chart, selling 51,000 copies in its first week. It is the band's highest charting debut of their career, but not the highest sales debut, as their prior album, No World for Tomorrow, debuted with 62,000 copies sold in its first week of sale in 2007.
- Bullet For My Valentine releases their third studio album, Fever. It debuts at number 3 on the Billboard 200 chart, selling 71,000 copies. It is a career high for the band.

=== May ===
- Three Days Grace's single "The Good Life" tops the Billboard Mainstream Rock chart for 5 weeks.
- Godsmack releases their fourth studio album, The Oracle. It tops the Billboard 200 chart, selling 117,000 copies in its opening week.
- Deftones releases their sixth studio album, and their first in four years, Diamond Eyes. It debuts at number 6 on the Billboard 200, selling 62,000. It is the first album without original bassist Chi Cheng, who entered a long-term coma in 2008.
- Stone Temple Pilots releases their sixth studio album, Stone Temple Pilots. It debuts at number 2 on the Billboard 200, selling 62,000 copies. The album is their first since their 2002 breakup, and last to feature the band's original lineup following Scott Weiland's dismissal in 2013 and death in 2015. It is also the first of two self-titled albums the band release, later releasing an entirely different Stone Temple Pilots album in 2018.
- The Black Keys release their sixth studio album, Brothers. It debuts at number 3 on the Billboard 200 chart, selling 73,000 copies. It holds on to number 8 in its second week as well, selling another 26,000 copies.

=== June ===
- Tom Petty and the Heartbreakers release their twelfth studio album, Mojo. It debuts at number 2 on the Billboard 200, selling 125,000 copies in its first week of release.

=== July ===
- Shinedown's single "The Crow & the Butterfly" tops the Billboard Mainstream Rock chart for a single week. It also finds minor crossover success, breaking into the Billboard all-format Hot 100 chart at number 97.
- Nickelback finds crossover success with their single "This Afternoon", which peaks at number 34 on the Billboard all-format Hot 100 chart. It is also the bands tenth song to reach the top 40 of the chart.
- Ozzy Osbourne's single "Let Me Hear You Scream" tops the Billboard Mainstream Rock chart and stays there for 4 weeks.
- Avenged Sevenfold releases their fifth studio album, Nightmare. It tops the Billboard 200 chart, selling 163,000 copies in its first week.
- Korn releases their ninth studio album, Korn III: Remember Who You Are. It debuts at number 2 on the Billboard 200, selling 63,000 copies.

=== August ===
- Disturbed releases their fifth studio album, Asylum. It tops the Billboard 200 chart, selling 179,000 copies in its opening week. It is the band's fourth album in a row to top the chart.
- Disturbed's single "Another Way to Die" tops the Mainstream Rock chart and stays there for 8 consecutive weeks.

=== September ===
- Linkin Park releases their fourth studio album, A Thousand Suns. It tops the Billboard 200 chart, selling 241,000 copies in its opening week. It holds on to number 3 in its second week, selling another 70,000 copies.
- Stone Sour releases their third studio album, Audio Secrecy. It debuts at number 6 on the Billboard 200 chart, selling 46,000 copies.
- Weezer releases their eighth studio album, Hurley. It debuts at number 6 on the Billboard 200 chart, selling 45,000 copies. The album's title and cover art is a reference to the character Hugo "Hurley" Reyes (Jorge Garcia) from the television series Lost.

=== October ===
- Kings of Leon release their fifth studio album, Come Around Sundown. It debuts at number 2 on the Billboard 200 chart, and tops the national album charts for 12 other national charts.

=== November ===
- My Chemical Romance releases their fourth studio album, Danger Days: The True Lives of the Fabulous Killjoys. It debuts at number 8 on the Billboard 200 chart, selling 112,000 copies in its opening week. In the same month, they release their single "Sing", which sees crossover success, later peaking at number 58 on the Billboard US all-format Hot 100 chart.

=== December ===
- Three Days Grace's single "World So Cold". It tops the Mainstream Rock chart for 5 consecutive weeks.

=== Year end ===
- Billboard publishes an end-of-year feature that outlines the declining relevance of rock music in mainstream music in favor of pop music and rap music, which correctly predicts musical trends that occur through the 2010s.
- The low sales of Guitar Hero: Warriors of Rock, the 2010 iteration of Activision's Guitar Hero rock music video game series, fall well below estimates. NPD Group reported 86,000 units sold in the United States across all platforms for the last five days of September during which it was available. This figure fell below the initial sales of the previous games, such as 1.5 million and 500,000 units in first-week sales for Guitar Hero III: Legends of Rock (2007) and Guitar Hero World Tour (2008), respectively. Weak sales of Warriors of Rock, in part, led to Activision closing its Guitar Hero business unit and cancelling a planned 2011 sequel.

== Deaths ==
- Paul Gray, original bassist of Slipknot.

== Band breakups ==
- Mudvayne
- Fall Out Boy
