= Loose Id =

Loose Id is a single-movement composition for brass quintet and percussion—later expanded for orchestra—by the American composer Steven Bryant. The original brass quintet version premiered November 1995 at the University of North Texas and the full orchestral version premiered at Alice Tully Hall, New York City on April 1, 1997, with conductor Jeffrey Milarsky leading the Juilliard Symphony. The piece was Bryant's first composition for orchestra.

== Composition ==
In the program notes for the work, Bryant described the inspiration for the work, writing:

This piece is an abstract realization in sound of the energy of the Id. Unleashed, without the counterbalance of Ego or Superego, the Id generates unbridled instinctual energy, resulting in an orgiastic frenzy. Distinct from a state of dementia, this piece represents a thoroughly lucid and intentional rampage of self-indulgence.

=== Instrumentation ===
The brass quintet version of Loose Id is scored for two trumpets, French horn, trombone, bass trombone, and percussion (timpani and ride cymbal).

The orchestral expansion of the piece is scored for piccolo, two flutes, two oboes, two clarinets, bass clarinet, two bassoons, contrabassoon, four French horns, three trumpets, three trombones (two tenor trombones and bass trombone), tuba, timpani, three percussionists, and strings.

== Reception ==
The composer Samuel Adler lauded the piece as being "orchestrated like a virtuoso" and said "it out-'Infernal Machines' 'The Infernal Machine,'" referring to the second movement from Christopher Rouse's triptych Phantasmata. AllMusic praised the composition as "an exhilarating piece of writing that, in its short, four-minute timespan isn't likely to wear out its welcome under any circumstances."
