= Spiritus Dei =

Studio album by Les Prêtres
- Released: 29 March 2010
- Genre: Religious music
- Length: 54:28
- Label: TF1

Spiritus Dei is the debut album of French trio Les Prêtres released in 29 March 2010 (29-3-10) and achieved success in France.

== Background ==
At the initiative of Mgr Jean-Michel di Falco, Bishop of Gap and Embrun (Hautes-Alpes), two priests and one seminarian in the diocese of Gap recorded an album under the label of TF1 Musique for the benefit of two projects, the first one is for a pastoral purpose (construction of a church) and another is for a charity goal (construction of a school in Madagascar). The three singers are Jean-Michel Bardet, pastor of the Cathedral of Gap, Charles Troesch, chaplain of the Basilica of Our Lady of Laus, and Nguyen Dinh Nguyen, seminarian in the diocese. This project was inspired by the Irish group The Priests.

The album contains a cover version of Daniel Lévi's song, "L'Envie d'aimer" and another one of Francis Cabrel's 1987 hit "Il faudra leur dire".

== Chart performance ==
The album entered the French Albums Chart at number five on 3 April and reached number one two weeks later, and remained atop for nine consecutive weeks. Its highest weekly sales are over 27,300 units on the chart edition of 30 May 2010. The album reached platinum status after a few weeks and became Diamond after eight months. It reached number-one again nine months after its release, on 1 January 2011.

The albums reached number five for three weeks on the Belgian (Wallonia) Albums Chart.

== Track listing ==
1. "Spiritus Dei (Sarabande)" (Di Falco Leandri, George Frideric Handel) — 4:13
2. "I Believe" (Levi) — 4:12
3. "Quand on n'a que l'amour" (Jacques Brel) — 3:30
4. "Il est né le divin enfant" — 2:59
5. "Ave Maria" (Schubert) — 4:14
6. "Amazing Grace" (John Newton) — 4:45
7. "L'Envie d'aimer" (Lionel Florence, Patrice Guirao, Pascal Obispo) — 4:38
8. "Ave Verum Corpus" (Mozart) — 3:00
9. "Je crois en toi" (Didier Barbelivien) — 3:24
10. "Conversation avec Dieu" (Di Falco Leandri, Roger Loubet) — 4:19
11. "Alléluia (Hallelujah)" (Leonard Cohen) — 4:45
12. "Il faudra leur dire" (Francis Cabrel) — 3:42
13. "Minuit Chrétien" (Adolphe Adam) — 4:03
14. "L'histoire de Spiritus Dei" (Florent Bidoyen, Jean-Michel Di Falco Leandri, Roger Loubet) — 2:44

== Charts and sales ==
=== Weekly charts ===
Chart (2010)	Peak position
Belgian Albums (Ultratop Wallonia)	5
European Top 100 Albums	23
French Albums (SNEP)	1
Swiss Albums (Schweizer Hitparade)	32

=== Year-end charts ===
Chart (2010)	Position
Belgian Albums (Ultratop Wallonia)	24
French Albums (SNEP)	2

Chart (2011)	Position
Belgian Albums (Ultratop Wallonia)	40
French Albums (SNEP)	19

=== Sales and certifications ===
Region	Certification	Sales/shipments
France (SNEP)	Double Diamond	1,200,000
