= For Century Ultimate Zest =

EP by F.Cuz
- Released: 27 April 2012
- Recorded: 2012
- Genre: Pop, dance
- Label: CAN Entertainment; KMP Holdings

F.Cuz chronology
Gorgeous (EP) (2010)	For Century Ultimate Zest (2012)

Singles from For Century Ultimate Zest
- 1. "No. 1" Released: April 27, 2012

For Century Ultimate Zest is the 3rd Korean mini-album released by the South Korean boy band F.Cuz. The album was released in physical and digital format on April 27, 2012. For Century Ultimate Zest is the first album with their new 5 member line up after former member Lee-U's withdrawal.

== Track listing ==
For Century Ultimate Zest
No.	Title	Length
1.	"야누스" (Janus)	3:30
2.	"전화좀 받아" (Answer the Phone)	3:00
3.	"Rise Up"	3:53
4.	"있을때 잘해봐" (Good Luck)	3:39
5.	"No. 1"	3:21
6.	"있을때 잘해봐" (Good Luck – DJ Rubato Remix)	3:43
Total length:		21:06

For Century Ultimate Zest Standard Edition Japan
No.	Title	Length
1.	"야누스" (Janus)	3:30
2.	"전화좀 받아" (Answer the Phone)	3:00
3.	"Rise Up"	3:53
4.	"있을때 잘해봐" (Good Luck)	3:39
5.	"No. 1"	3:23
6.	"있을때 잘해봐" (Good Luck – Club Version)	3:43
7.	"Say U Say Me" (New Version)	3:33
8.	"BMG (Boy Meet Girl)" (New Version)	3:15
Total length:		27:54

For Century Ultimate Zest Collector's Edition Japan
No.	Title	Length
1.	"야누스" (Janus)	3:30
2.	"전화좀 받아" (Answer the Phone)	3:00
3.	"Rise Up"	3:53
4.	"있을때 잘해봐" (Good Luck)	3:39
5.	"No. 1"	3:21
6.	"있을때 잘해봐" (Good Luck – Club Version)	3:43
7.	"Because of You" (New Version)	3:36
8.	"U Crazy" (New Version)	3:34
Total length:		28:16

For Century Ultimate Zest Collector's Edition DVD Japan
No.	Title	Length
1.	"No.1 PV"
2.	"Making of No.1 PV"

== Chart performance ==
=== Singles ===
Title	Peak positions
Title	KOR Gaon
"No. 1"	132

== Sales ==
Chart (2012)	Amount
Gaon Physical Sales	2,413
