= Israel Symphony Orchestra Rishon LeZion =

The Israel Symphony Orchestra Rishon LeZion (ISO) (Hebrew: התזמורת הסימפונית הישראלית ראשון לציון) was founded in 1988 by the municipality of Rishon LeZion. A year later, in 1989, it became the resident orchestra of the Israeli Opera in Tel Aviv. Like the opera orchestra, ISO participates in all performances of Israeli opera at the Tel Aviv opera and in the great outdoor performances, crowned in recent years with performances at the Masada Festival.

Among the musical directors of the orchestra are: Shimon Cohen, Noam Sheriff, Asher Fisch, Mendi Rodan, Dan Ettinger and James Judd. The newly appointed music director and principal conductor is Dan Ettinger. The Director General is Ofer Sela. ISO offers a variety of subscription series, family concerts and special performances for young and old members of the community.

The ISO has been awarded the ACUM Prize. It has been the first Israeli orchestra to publicly perform works by Richard Strauss, Alexander von Zemlinsky and others, classical music programs, Contemporary music, popular Israeli songs and popular music, contemporary dance, modern art, film and other media.

The ISO has toured in Europe, China and South America. ISO records works for radio and television, and has released a series of compact discs including Israeli premieres.
