= James Judd =

British conductor (born 1949)

- Born: October 30, 1949 (age 77); Hertford, England
- Education: Trinity College of Music
- Occupation: conductor
- Organizations: The Cleveland Orchestra (assistant conductor); European Union Youth Orchestra (associate music director); The Little Orchestra Society (music director); Miami Music Project (founder)
- Notable work: Music Director, New Zealand Symphony Orchestra (1999–2007); Music Director, Florida Philharmonic (1987–2001); Music Director, Israel Symphony Orchestra Rishon LeZion (2014– ); Artistic Director & Principal Conductor, Daejeon Philharmonic Orchestra (2016–2022); Chief Conductor, Slovak Philharmonic (2017–2021)
- Spouse: Valerie Judd
- Children: 1 daughter

James Judd (born 30 October 1949) is a British conductor.

== Early life and education ==
James Judd grew up in Hertford, learning the piano, flute and organ as a child and discovering his talent for conducting at high school. He studied at the Trinity College of Music in London.

== Career ==
After graduating Judd was an assistant conductor of The Cleveland Orchestra under Lorin Maazel, after which he served as associate music director of the European Union Youth Orchestra under Claudio Abbado. Judd made his US opera debut in 1988 conducting Don Giovanni for the Florida Grand Opera. Judd was the last full-time music director of the Florida Philharmonic, from 1987 to 2001. In 2013, Judd was appointed music director of The Little Orchestra Society. Judd is the founder of Miami Music Project, a non profit organization, which provides music education to children inspirated on an El Sistema-style model.

Judd was appointed music director of the New Zealand Symphony Orchestra (NZSO), the first NZSO conductor with that title, in 1999. He held that position until 2007. He conducted several recordings with the NZSO for the Naxos label, and led the NZSO in its first-ever appearance at The Proms and Concertgebouw in Amsterdam in 2005. Judd now holds the title of Music Director Emeritus of the NZSO.

In 2014, Judd became music director of the Israel Symphony Orchestra Rishon LeZion. He offered to waive his salary in 2015, in the wake of financial difficulties at the orchestra.

In September 2016, Judd was appointed artistic director and principal conductor of the Daejeon Philharmonic Orchestra in Korea. He concluded his artistic directorship of the orchestra as of the close of the 2021–2022 season.

He became chief conductor of the Slovak Philharmonic Orchestra as of the 2017–2018 season. As of 2019, he was scheduled to conclude his chief conductorship at the end of the 2019–2020 season, but as a former chief conductor he continues to return to work with the orchestra.

Judd has returned to New Zealand to live while holding the position of artistic director and principal conductor of the Daejeon Philharmonic Orchestra in South Korea.

Judd and his wife Valerie, a former member of the New World Symphony Orchestra, have a daughter.

Cultural offices
Preceded by Emerson Buckley	Music Director, Florida Philharmonic Orchestra; 1987–2001	Succeeded by Joseph Silverstein (acting music director)
Preceded by Franz-Paul Decker (chief conductor)	Music Director, New Zealand Symphony Orchestra; 1999–2007	Succeeded by Pietari Inkinen
Preceded by Dan Ettinger (chief conductor)	Music Director, Israel Symphony Orchestra Rishon LeZion; 2014–2017	Succeeded by Dan Ettinger
Preceded by Nosang Geum	Music Director, Daejeon Philharmonic; 2016–2022	Succeeded by (post vacant)
Preceded by Emmanuel Villaume	Chief Conductor, Slovak Philharmonic; 2017–2020	Succeeded by Daniel Raiskin
