= Israeli Opera =

Opera company in Israel

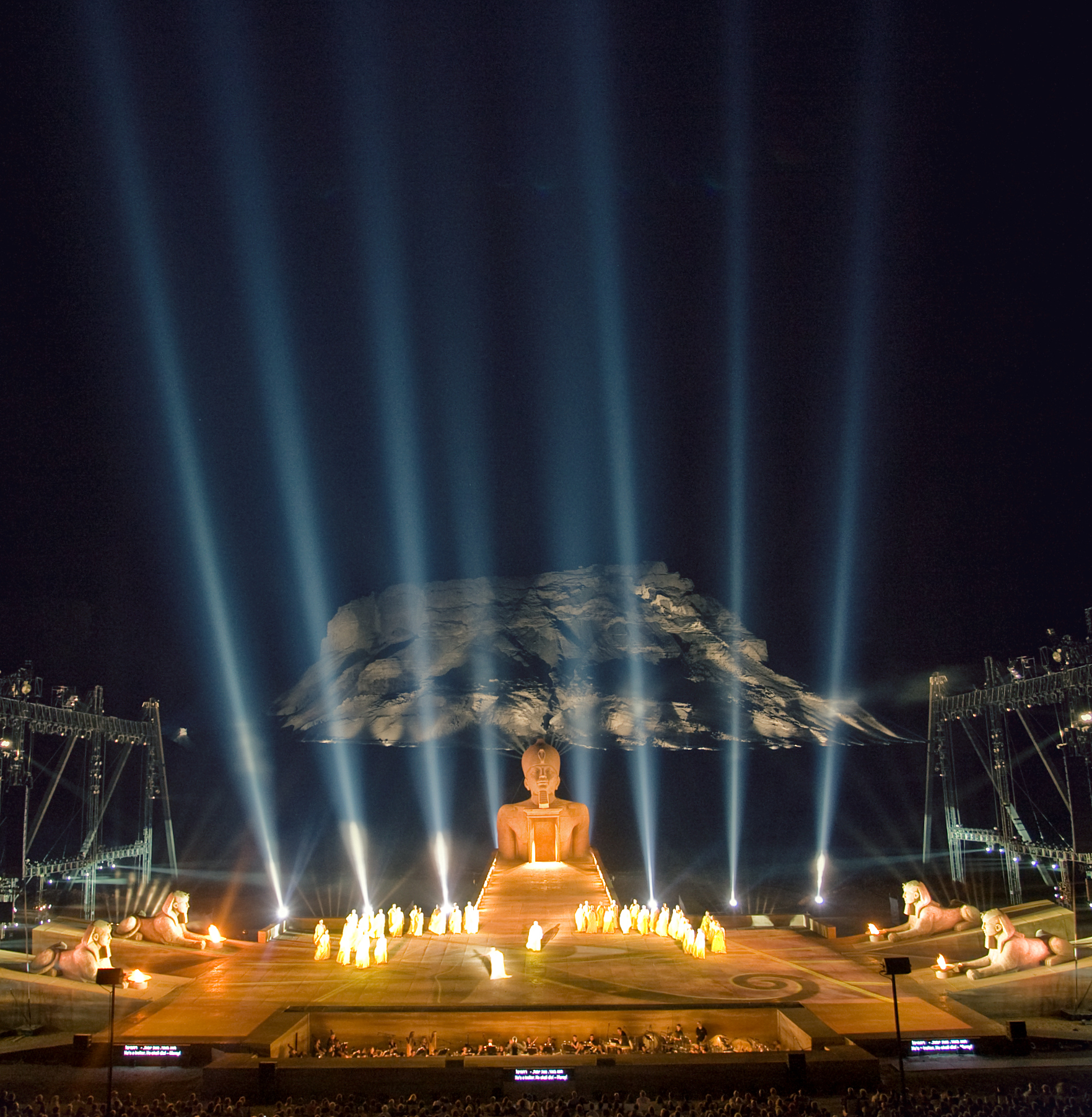
The Israeli Opera performing Aida at the foot of Masada, 11 June 2011

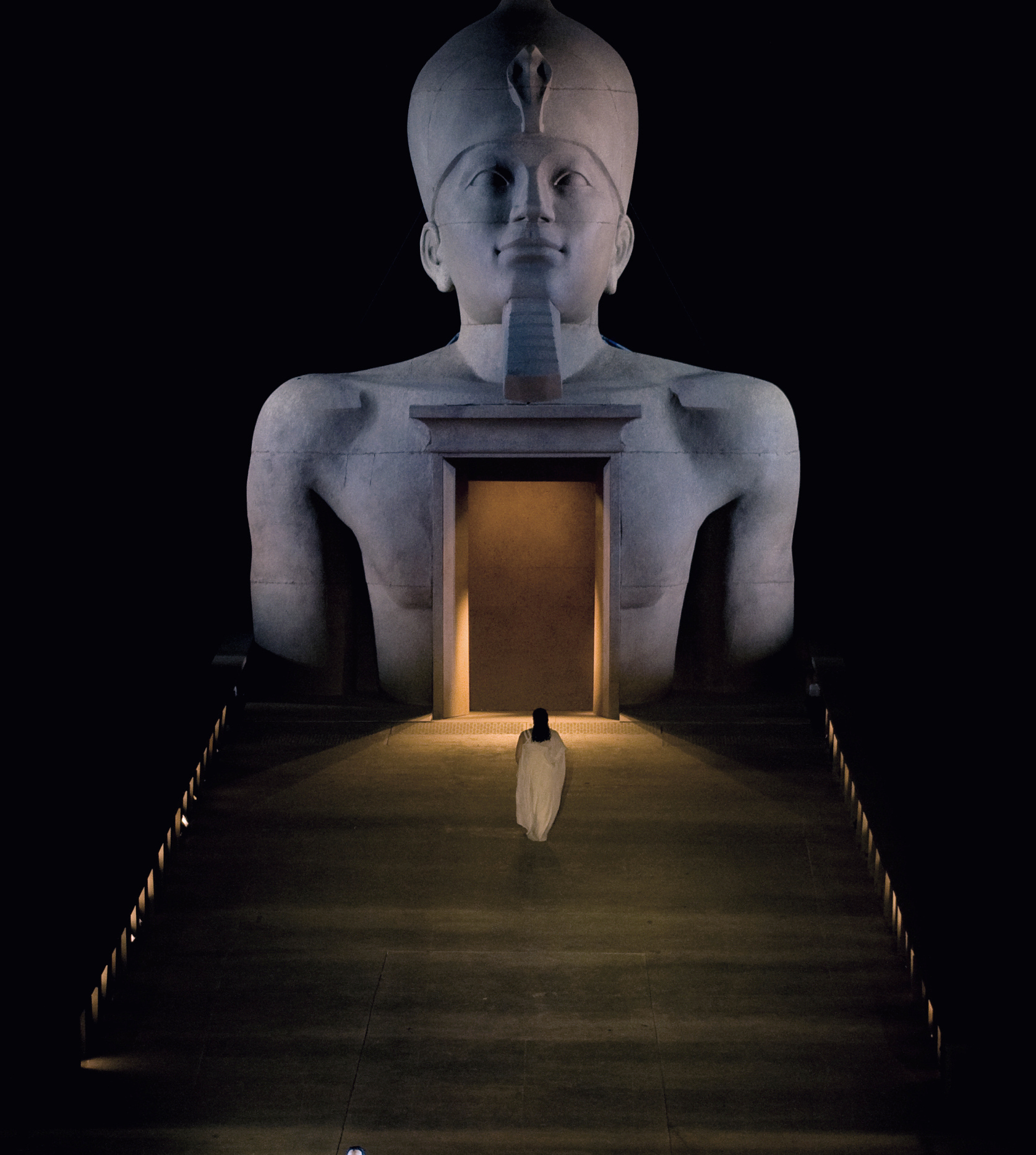
Aida at the foot of Masada, focusing on the set.

The Israeli Opera (האופרה הישראלית), formerly known as the New Israeli Opera, is the principal opera company of Israel. It was founded in 1985 after lack of Israeli government funding led to the demise of the Israel National Opera. Since 1994 the Tel Aviv Performing Arts Center has been its main performance venue. The company also founded the Israeli Opera Festival which has performed large-scale outdoor productions, originally at Caesarea, and from 2010 in Masada.

The company's General Director is Zach Granite who replaced Hanna Munitz who held the post from 1995 until 2016. Its music director as of 2018 is Dan Ettinger.

== History ==
Opera in pre-statehood Israel was established by Mordechai Golinkin. Having heard the Balfour Declaration in 1917, Golinkin, a Jewish conductor born in the Russian Empire, founded a Jewish choir, the purpose of which was making enough money to found an Opera in the fledgling Jewish state. The choir gave concerts around the Russian Empire, with the chief highlight being a concert in 1918 in Petrograd, in which Feodor Chaliapin sang Hatikvah. In 1923, having gathered sufficient funds, Golinkin emigrated to Mandatory Palestine. On July 28, 1923, the Erez-Israeli Opera held its first performance with Giuseppe Verdi's La Traviata, conducted by Mordechai Golinkin. In the absence of an opera house, the performance was held in a cinema building.

It had been Golinkin's original intention to establish the opera in Jerusalem, but Tel Aviv was finally chosen because most of the performing artists lived in this city. In the four years following the première, 17 different operas were performed by the Erez-Israeli Opera. However, by the end of 1927 Golinkin had no more funds to continue running the opera. Golinkin travelled to the United States to find sponsors, but having returned in 1929, performances could not be restarted due to the 1929 Palestine riots.

In 1945, American soprano Edis de Philippe founded the Israel National Opera. This was Israel's principal opera company until 1982, when cessation of funding from the Ministry of Culture and Education caused the company to close. However, in 1985, The Council for Arts and Culture created The New Israeli Opera by brokering a partnership between the Cameri Theatre of Tel Aviv and the Israel Chamber Orchestra. Uri Offer, the then general director of the Cameri Theatre, was appointed general director of the New Israeli Opera, a post he held for a decade, and Yoav Talmi, who was the music director of the Israel Chamber Orchestra, was appointed music director of the New Israeli Opera.

In the 1987/88 season the New Israeli Opera's first production was aired: Dido and Aeneas by Henry Purcell at the Cameri Theater in Tel Aviv. In 1995 the world premiere of the opera Josef by Josef Tal was conducted by Gary Bertini and directed by David Olden. Journey to the End of the Millennium, a Hebrew opera based on A. B. Yehoshua's book was conducted and especially commissioned for the opera's 20th anniversary.

Today the Israeli Opera is directed by Hanna Munitz. All Israeli Opera productions are sung in the original language with Hebrew and English surtitles and presented at the Opera House at the Tel Aviv Performing Arts Center, opened in 1994. In recent years the Israeli Opera also presents dance, classical music, jazz and children music series at the Opera House.

The Opera Tower however, shouldn't be confused with the Opera House. This was the place where the former Opera House was placed, and founded in 1993 and used today as a luxurious hotel.

== Present Day ==
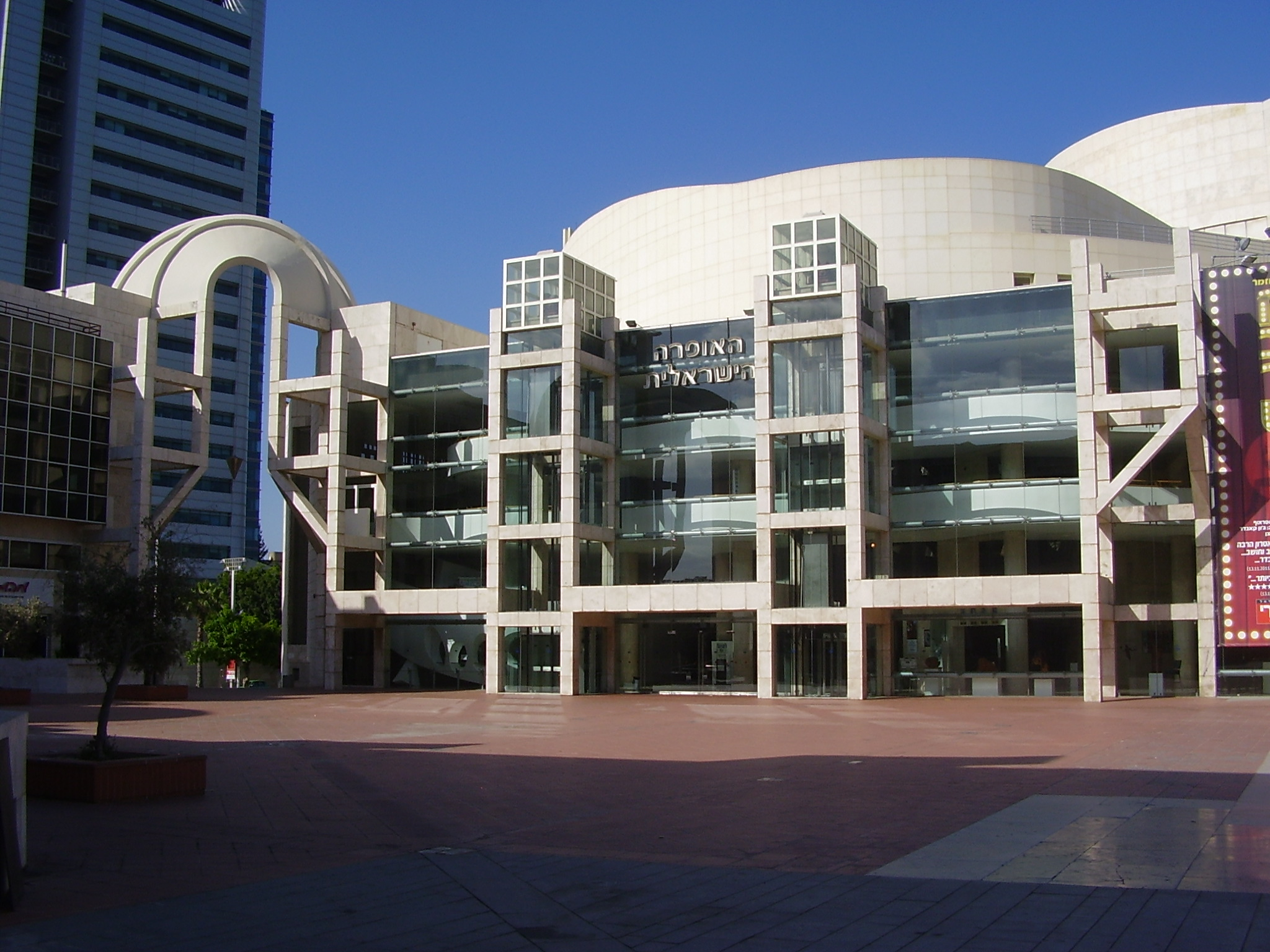
Facade of the opera house in the Tel Aviv Performing Arts Center

=== The Tel Aviv Performing Arts Center ===
The Tel Aviv Performing Arts Center is the residence of the Israeli Opera since 1994. The building was designed by Yaakov Rechter, and the foyer - by Ron Arad. The Tel Aviv Performing Arts Center forms the main part of the Golda Center, located between Weizmann St., Shaul Hamelech Blvd. and Leonardo da Vinci St. This area had been designated for public buildings in the late 1950s. Throughout the years, the Tel Aviv Museum of Art, Beit Ariela Sha'ar Zion Library and the Piazza connecting them were built there. In the early 1980s, the Municipality of Tel Aviv-Yafo designated the western part of the area for the Performing Arts Center, one of the major cultural complexes of Tel Aviv. Since its inauguration, the Tel Aviv Performing Arts Center has been the permanent house of the Israeli Opera. Later on its additional wing was completed, housing the Cameri Theater.

=== Orchestra ===
The orchestra currently working with the Israeli Opera is the Israel Symphony Orchestra Rishon LeZion (ISO). The orchestra was founded in 1988 in the municipality of Rishon LeZion, and became the resident orchestra of the Israeli Opera in 1989. The current music director and chief conductor of the ISO is Dan Ettinger and the director general is Ofer Sela.

In addition to its work with the Israeli Opera, the ISO offers symphonic subscription series, family concerts and special performances for young people and senior members of the community in Tel Aviv and in Rishon LeZion. The ISO was the first orchestra in Israel to perform works by Richard Strauss and Alexander Zemlinsky. For its dedication and its outstanding achievement in the advancement of original Israeli works the ISO has been awarded the ACUM Prize.

=== Meitar Opera Studio ===
Founded in 2000, the Meitar Opera Studio is a practical study and performance program for young Israeli opera singers who graduated from any given music academy and who are getting ready for an operatic career. The major goal of the Meitar Opera Studio is to help young opera singers to work in their profession and gain stage experience. Singers who are part of the program perform in Israeli Opera productions as well as concerts in Israel and abroad.

=== The opera house and children ===
The Israeli Opera offers two programs aimed specifically at children:

- Children Opera Hour: One hour long opera performances in full costume, accompanied by piano and commentary, performed by singers of the Meitar Opera Studio. This program is aimed at children aged 5–10.
- Sounds of Magic: Children show, running since 2001, written and edited by Nitza Saul. Sounds of Magic is aimed at children aged 2–6. Each show focuses on introducing the children to one composer, musical style or era.

In addition, the opera offers education programs, lectures and workshops for schools and kindergartens.

== Israel Opera Festival ==
The Israel open-air opera festival was inaugurated by the Israeli Opera in 2010. The main events of the festival take place in Masada, with additional operas sung in the Sultan's Pool in Jerusalem and in the Citadel of Acre.

As part of the Israeli Opera's social activity, dress rehearsals in Masada are open free of charge to periphery inhabitants.

== World premieres ==
Operas which were given their world premiere by Israeli Opera include:

- Josef Tal's Josef (1995)
- Gil Shohat's Alpha and Omega (2001)
- Gil Shohat's The Child Dreams (2010)

== Music directors ==
- Yoav Talmi (1985–1988)
- Gary Bertini (1988–2005)
- Asher Fisch (2005–2008)
- David Stern (2008–2014)
- Daniel Oren (2014–2017)
- Dan Ettinger (2018–present)
