= Il faudra leur dire =

Single by Cabrel et les enfants
- Language: French
- Released: 1986
- Label: CBS Disques
- Songwriter(s): Francis Cabrel
- Producer(s): Georges Augier

"Il faudra leur dire" is a song by Francis Cabrel. It was released as a single (credited to Cabrel et les enfants) in 1986.

== Background and writing ==
The song was written and composed by Francis Cabrel himself. The recording was produced by Georges Augier.

== Commercial performance ==
The song reached no. 2 in France.

== Track listings ==
7" single CBS 650291 7 (1986)

1. "Il faudra leur dire" (3:42)
2. "Il faudra leur dire" (Instrumental) (3:42)

== Cover versions ==
The song has been recorded, among others, by Michèle Torr with Nina Vidal-Guigues, Michèle's granddaughter, Kids United with Corneille, Les Prêtres, and Vox Angeli.

== Charts ==
=== Weekly charts ===
Initial chart performance for "Il faudra leur dire"
Chart (1987)	Peak position
France (SNEP)	2

2015 chart performance for "Il faudra leur dire"
Chart (2015)	Peak position
Belgium (Ultratop Back Catalogue Singles Wallonia)	41

=== Year-end charts ===
1987 year-end chart performance for "Il faudra leur dire"
Chart (1987)	Peak position
European Top 100 Singles (Music & Media)	45
