= Gorgeous (EP) =

EP by F.Cuz
- Released: 18 November 2010
- Recorded: 2010
- Genres: Pop, dance
- Labels: CAN&J Entertainment; CJ E&M; KMP Holdings

F.Cuz chronology
No One (EP) (2010)	Gorgeous (2010)	For Century Ultimate Zest (2012)

Gorgeous is the second mini-album released by the South Korean boy band, F.Cuz. The album was released in physical and digital format on November 18, 2010. The mini-album was also released in Japan and Taiwan on December 8, 2010 and December 16, 2010, respectively.

== Track listing ==
Gorgeous
No.	Title	Length
1.	"Intro"	0:56
2.	"U Crazy"	3:22
3.	"Midnight Sun"	4:05
4.	"친구졸업" (Wanna Be Your Love)	3:31
5.	"Say U Say Me"	3:33
6.	"내꺼" (Mine)	3:44
7.	"괜찮아" (It's Okay)	3:32
8.	"Midnight Sun" (Remix)	4:07
9.	"친구졸업" (Wanna Be Your Love - Inst.)	3:32
10.	"Midnight Sun" (Inst.)	4:06
11.	"Outro"	1.09
Total length:		35:30

F.CUZ Japan Premium Edition Japan
No.	Title	Length
1.	"Intro"	0:56
2.	"U Crazy"	3:22
3.	"Midnight Sun"	4:05
4.	"友達卒業" (Wanna Be Your Love)	3:31
5.	"Say U Say Me"	3:33
6.	"You Are Mine"	3:44
7.	"大丈夫" (It's Okay)	3:32
8.	"Midnight Sun" (Remix)	4:07
9.	"友達卒業" (Wanna Be Your Love - Inst.)	3:32
10.	"Midnight Sun" (Inst.)	4:06
11.	"Outro"	1.09
Total length:		35:30

F.CUZ Japan Premium Edition DVD Japan
No.	Title	Length
1.	"Music Videos"
2.	"Making Of"
3.	"Members' Comments"

Gorgeous Taiwan
No.	Title	Length
1.	"Intro"	0:56
2.	"U Crazy"	3:22
3.	"Midnight Sun"	4:05
4.	"從朋友畢業" (Wanna Be Your Love)	3:31
5.	"Say U Say Me"	3:33
6.	"你是我的" (Mine)	3:44
7.	"沒關係" (It's Okay)	3:32
8.	"Midnight Sun" (Remix)	4:07
9.	"從朋友畢業" (Wanna Be Your Love - Inst.)	3:32
10.	"Midnight Sun" (Inst.)	4:06
11.	"Outro"	1.09
Total length:		35:30
