= 2010 in New Zealand music =

The following is a list of notable events and releases that happened or are expected to happen in 2010 in New Zealand music.

== Events ==
=== January ===
- 15 January: Big Day Out (see lineup)
- 29 January – 1 February: Parachute music festival (see lineup)

=== May ===
- 1 May: Music television channel C42 launches, aiming to play 30% New Zealand music

== Albums released ==
=== March ===
- 15 March: Humour and the Misfortune of Others by Hollie Smith
- 17 March: My Own Way by Darren Ross
- 29 March: The Experiment by Dane Rumble

=== April ===
- 5 April: Love in Motion by Anika Moa

=== June ===
- 11 June: Intriguer by Crowded House
- 14 June: Live at Roundhouse by Fat Freddy's Drop

=== July ===
- 4 July: Modern Fables by Julia Deans
- 5 July: Evolution - Past, Present, Beyond by Deceptikonz

=== August ===
- 2 August: Until the End of Time by Opshop
- 20 August: From the Inside Out by Stan Walker
- 23 August: Beheaded Ouroboros by Witchrist
- Passive Me, Aggressive You by The Naked and Famous

=== September ===
- 20 September: Ignite by Shihad

=== October ===
- 4 October: Perfect Flaws by Black River Drive
- 11 October: 5th Degree by Autozamm

=== November ===
- 30 November: DARREN! by Darren Ross

== Awards ==
New Zealand Music Awards

The winners of the 2010 New Zealand Music Awards, or 'Tuis', will be announced on 7 October.

== Number-ones in 2010 ==
Record charts in New Zealand are published by the Recording Industry Association of New Zealand every week.

=== Singles ===
The longest running number-one single in 2010 so far is Stan Walker's "Black Box", topping the chart for six consecutive weeks of 2010.

=== Albums ===
Susan Boyle's I Dreamed a Dream was the number-one album for six non-consecutive weeks of 2010.

=== Compilations ===
Now That's What I Call Music 32 (N.Z. series) remained as the number-one compilation album for twelve non-consecutive weeks of 2010.

=== Music DVDs ===
André Rieu's Live in Sydney 2009 has reached the top spot in 2010 for five non-consecutive weeks.

=== Radio airplays ===
"Black Box" by Stan Walker was the most-played on New Zealand radio stations for nine consecutive weeks of 2010.
