= Kamal Mahsud =

Kamal Mahsud (Pashto & Urdu: کمال محسود) was a Pashto language folk singer from Waziristan, Khyber Pakhtunkhwa, Pakistan. He died on January 7, 2010.

Mahsud was a popular singer in his home province. His better-known songs include Tum Chalay Aawo and Da Ghroona Ghroona. An album of his songs for peace was distributed free by Pakistan Army's Inter Services Public Relations department in South Waziristan.

One of Mahsud's famous songs, ‘Dha Thazhaa Thazhaa Waziristan Dai, Tharikh Yaa Malom Pa Tool Jahan Dhai’ is an ode to the beautiful land of Waziristan, and its people.
