= Steven Bryant (composer) =

American composer and conductor

- Born: 28 May 1972 (age 54)
- Occupations: Composer and conductor

Steven Bryant (born May 28, 1972, in Little Rock, Arkansas) is an American composer and conductor. His catalog of works includes pieces for orchestra, wind ensemble, electronics, and chamber music. Bryant states: "I strive to write music that leaps off the stage (or reaches out of the speakers) to grab you by the collar and pull you in. Whether through a relentless eruption of energy, or the intensity of quiet contemplation, I want my music to give you no choice, and no other desire, but to listen."

== Biography ==
Steven Bryant has studied composition with John Corigliano at The Juilliard School, Cindy McTee at the University of North Texas, and W. Francis McBeth at Ouachita Baptist University. With Frank Ticheli as his mentor, Bryant helped co-compose "Stomp" by Ticheli. Bryant's music has been performed by numerous ensembles across North America, Europe, and East Asia. His first orchestral work, Loose Id for Orchestra, hailed by celebrated composer Samuel Adler as "orchestrated like a virtuoso," was premiered by the Juilliard Symphony and is featured on a CD released by the Bowling Green Philharmonia on Albany Records. Alchemy in Silent Spaces, a new large-scale work commissioned by James DePreist and The Juilliard School, was premiered by the Juilliard Orchestra in May 2006.

Other notable commissions have come from the Amherst Saxophone Quartet (funded by the American Composers Jerome Composers Commissioning Program), the Indiana University Wind Ensemble, the US Air Force Band of Mid-America, the Calgary Stampede Band, and the University of Nevada Las Vegas Wind Orchestra. Recordings include multiple releases by Eugene Corporon and the University of North Texas Wind Symphony, the Ron Hufstader and the El Paso Wind Symphony, William Berz and the Rutgers University Wind Ensemble, and Thomas Leslie and the University of Nevada, Las Vegas Wind Orchestra. Bryant has also rearranged the Iggy Pop and the Stooges song "Real Cool Time" for the independent Italian record label Snowdonia, as well as music for portions of the Virtual Space Tour at space.com.

Bryant is a founding member of the composer-consortium BCM International (along with Eric Whitacre, Jonathan Newman, and Jim Bonney: four stylistically-diverse composers from across the country). BCM's music has generated a following of thousands around the world and two recordings: "BCM Saves the World" (2002, Mark Custom Records) and "BCM Men of Industry" (2004, BCM Records).

Bryant currently resides in Durham, North Carolina with his wife, conductor Verena Mösenbichler-Bryant. They spend summers in Austria.

== Awards ==
- National Band Association's William D. Revelli Composition Award: Radiant Joy, 2007
- National Band Association's William D. Revelli Composition Award: Suite Dreams, 2008
- National Band Association's William D. Revelli Composition Award: Ecstatic Waters, 2010
- American Bandmasters Association's Sousa/ABA/Ostwald Award: Concerto for Alto Saxophone, 2014

== Works ==
=== Orchestra ===
Title	Year
Loose Id for orchestra	(1996)
Rise, for string orchestra	(2003)
Alchemy in Silent Spaces	(2006)
Dusk	(2008)

=== Wind ensemble ===
Title	Year
Chester Leaps In	(1997)
Interruption Overture	(1998)
Monkey	(1998)
Alchemy in Silent Spaces	(2000)
RedLine	(2000)
ImPercynations	(2002)
Bloom	(2003)
MetaMarch	(2003)
Wings That Work	(2003)
Rise	(2003)
Stampede	(2003)
Dusk	(2004)
Radiant Joy	(2006)
First Light	(2007)
Suite Dreams	(2007)
Concerto for Wind Ensemble	(2007–2010)
Ecstatic Waters	(2008)
The Marbled Midnight Mile	(2009)
Zeal	(2018)
Axis Mundi	(2009)
Anthem	(2011)
Concerto for Cello	(2011)
Concerto for Alto Saxophone	(2014)
In This Broad Earth	(2015)
The Automatic Earth	(2019)

=== Mixed large ensemble ===
Title	Year
A Million Suns at Midnight, for band, string orchestra, and SATB chorus	(1999)
A Million Suns at Midnight, for band and chorus	(1999)

=== Chamber music ===
Title	Year
Loose Id, brass quintet and timpani	(1995)
RedLine, solo piano	(1999)
Rise, saxophone quartet	(2001)
RedLine, percussion quartet	(2005)
Loose Id, brass ensemble and drumset	(2006)
