= The Edge (compilation album) =

Compilation album by Various artists
- Released: December 8, 2009
- Recorded: Various times
- Genre: Rock
- Length: 3:12:39
- Label: Razor & Tie

The Edge is a various artists compilation, released by the Razor & Tie record label, on December 8, 2009.

The album's music is solely that of the alternative music genre, featuring popular bands prevalent in the genre. Many of the songs featured charted highly on either (or, in some cases, both) of the U.S. rock charts: the Mainstream Rock Tracks chart and the Modern Rock Tracks chart. While most of the tracks date from the 21st century of rock music, the featured Korn and Sublime songs date back to 1998 and 1996, respectively.

The three-disc set was a success on the U.S. charts, debuting at number four on the main Billboard 200 album chart, and topping both the Rock Albums and Alternative Albums charts as well.

== Track listing ==
=== Disc one ===
1. Puddle of Mudd : "She Hates Me"
2. Yellowcard : "Ocean Avenue"
3. Alien Ant Farm : "Smooth Criminal"
4. Sum 41 : "In Too Deep"
5. Hoobastank : "Running Away"
6. Godsmack : "Awake"
7. Trust Company : "Downfall"
8. 3 Doors Down : "Let Me Go"
9. Lifehouse : "First Time"
10. American Hi-Fi : "Flavor of the Weak"
11. Live : "Heaven"
12. Drowning Pool : "Bodies"
13. Bush : "Machinehead"
14. Sublime : "Wrong Way"
15. Bloodhound Gang : "The Bad Touch"
16. Alien Ant Farm : "Movies"

=== Disc two ===
1. Thirty Seconds to Mars : "The Kill (Bury Me)"
2. Jet : "Are You Gonna Be My Girl"
3. Evanescence : "Bring Me to Life"
4. Finger Eleven : "Paralyzer"
5. Panic! at the Disco : "I Write Sins Not Tragedies"
6. Staind : "Right Here"
7. Korn : "Freak on a Leash"
8. P.O.D. : "Alive"
9. Trapt : "Headstrong"
10. Chevelle : "Send the Pain Below"
11. Cold : "Stupid Girl"
12. Simple Plan : "Welcome to My Life"
13. Seether : "Remedy"
14. Three Days Grace : "Just Like You"
15. Taproot : "Poem"
16. The Donnas : "Take It Off"

=== Disc three ===
1. Creed : "With Arms Wide Open"
2. Staind : "So Far Away"
3. P.O.D. : "Youth of the Nation"
4. Hoobastank : "The Reason"
5. Finger Eleven : "One Thing"
6. Everclear : "Wonderful"
7. Hole : "Malibu"
8. Simple Plan : "Perfect"
9. 3 Doors Down : "Be Like That"
10. Our Lady Peace : "Clumsy"
11. Collective Soul : "December"
12. Bush : "Swallowed"
13. Live : "Selling the Drama"
14. Fuel : "Bad Day"
15. Oasis : "Don't Look Back in Anger"
16. Candlebox : "Cover Me"
17. Counting Crows : "Round Here"
18. Lifehouse : "You and Me"
