= Daniel Oren =

Israeli musician (born 1955)

- דניאל אורן
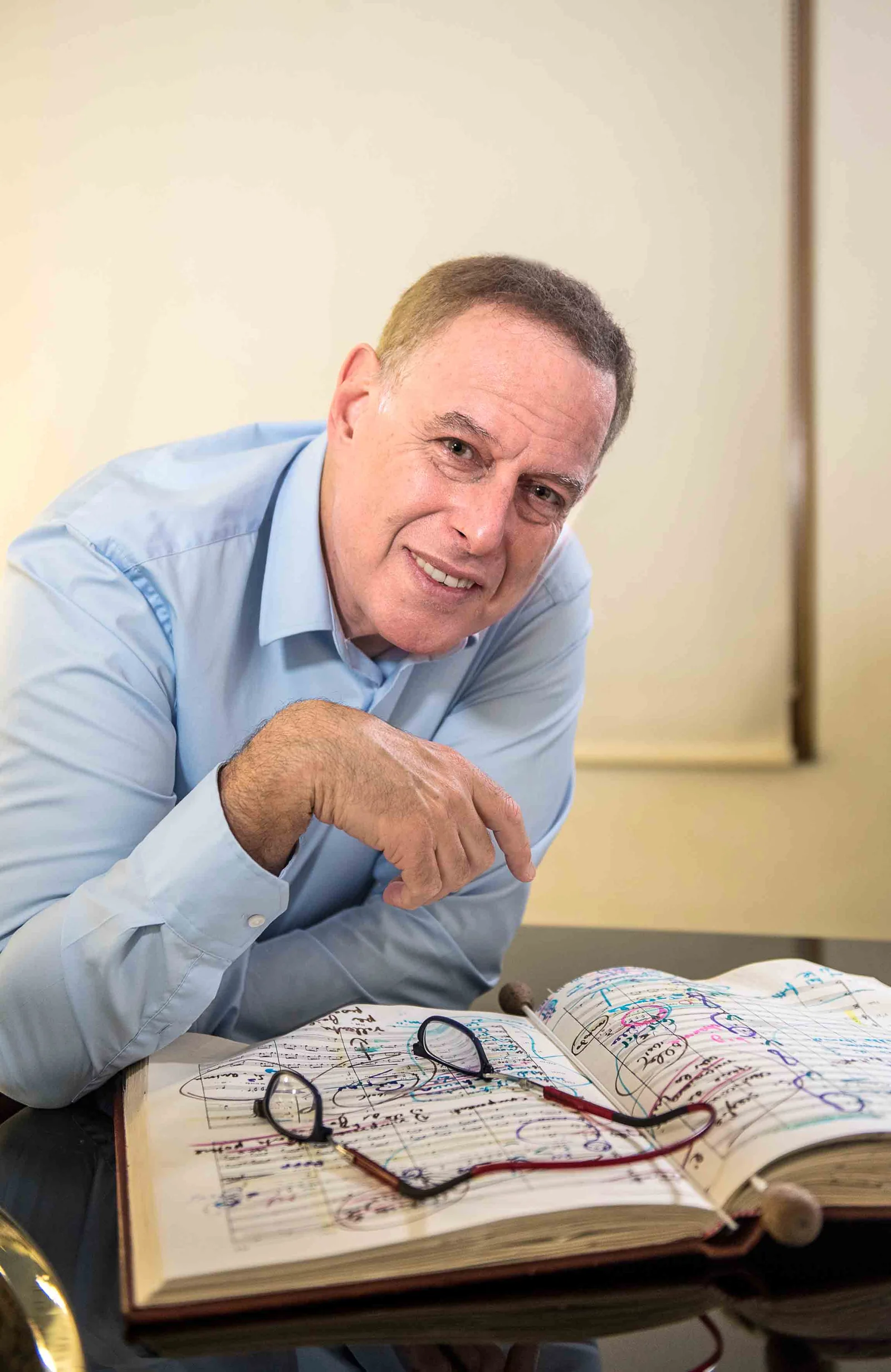
- Born: 25 May 1955 (age 71); Tel Aviv, Israel
- Occupation: Conductor

Daniel Oren (Hebrew: דניאל אורן; born 25 May 1955) is an Israeli conductor.

== Biography ==
Daniel Oren was born in Jaffa, Israel. For many years he was a religiously observant Jew and wore a yarmulke wherever he conducted. Today he only wears the yarmulke when conducting in Israel.

== Music career ==
When he was 13 years old, Oren was chosen by Leonard Bernstein to perform the boy solo part in Chichester Psalms. In 1975 he won first prize in the first Herbert von Karajan Conducting Competition. He also collaborated with conductors Herbert von Karajan and Franco Ferrara.

Oren began his international career in 1975, winning the first prize at the Karajan Competition Award. Three years later he held his debut in the United States at the Festival of Two Worlds in Spoleto. In 1984 he debuted in the Arena di Verona with Tosca sung by Shirley Verrett, Giacomo Aragall, and Ingvar Wixell. His "Tosca" from Rome opera house with Raina Kabaivanska and Luciano Pavarotti was released by RCA on CD and video. In December 1994 he led the New Israeli Opera opening with Verdi's Nabucco. In the summer of 1995, he conducted La Bohème at the Teatro Regio in Turin with the participation of Mirella Freni, Luciano Pavarotti and Nicolai Ghiaurov. In February 1996, he conducted Fedora with Mirella Freni at the Teatro Comunale of Bologna and Manon by Massenet at the Vienna State Opera – this production was repeated regularly every year. In 1996, he opened the season in the Arena of Verona with Carmen, followed by a concert in Tel Aviv which celebrated the 3000-year anniversary of Jerusalem (the soloists were Deborah Voigt, Agnes Baltsa, Roberto Alagna, Leo Nucci and Ferruccio Furlanetto). In September of that year he led a new production of Otello in Cyprus with the participation of Katia Ricciarelli, Giuseppe Giacomini and Renato Bruson and directed by Michael Hampe.

In the fall of 1996 he opened with Madama Butterfly at the Teatro Comunale in Florence and then to San Carlo in Naples with Tosca, with Luciano Pavarotti and Raina Kabaivanska. He also conducted Tosca at the Metropolitan in New York, Adriana Lecouvreur in Rome, Naples; Manon, Werther and Nabucco in Trieste, Il Trovatore in Palermo, Aida and Nabucco at the Arena di Verona, Manon Lescaut, Madama Butterfly and The Sleepwalker in Florence.

He conducted Carmen at the Royal Opera House in Covent Garden's opera, Andrea Chenier at the Carlo Felice in Genoa, Rigoletto at the Royal Opera House in Covent Garden, London, Tosca in Tel Aviv Opera, Aida and Turandot in Verona and Andrea Chénier and La Bohème Opera Bastille (Paris). At Covent Garden in London he conducted Romeo and Juliet, Rigoletto and Carmen.

After the success of Nabucco, Oren returned to the Festival Opera of Masada in June 2011 with Aida, repeated at the Arena of Verona. In 2012 he conducted Carmen at Massada and Mozart's Don Giovanni at the Arena of Verona directed by Franco Zeffirelli.

Since 2007 he has been the artistic director of the Municipal Theatre Giuseppe Verdi in Salerno.

Oren collaborates with the Royal Opera House in London, the Opera de Paris, the Arena di Verona, the Teatro San Carlo di Napoli, the Teatro del Maggio Musicale Fiorentino in Florence, the Teatro Real Madrid, Liceu Theatre in Barcelona, Theatre du Capitole at Toulouse, Shanghai Opera House, Ncpa Beijing, where Oren conducted Macbeth with Plácido Domingo.

In 2015 he conducted a concert in the Vatican City for poor people and immigrants in the presence of Pope Francis.

In 2018 he made his house debut at La Scala in Milan with Aida in the production by Franco Zeffirelli celebrating the latter's 95th birthday.

At the Israeli Opera he conducted Nabucco (Verdi), La Bohème, Tosca (Puccini) and La Juive (Halevy).

In May 2022, Verdi: La Traviata was released on the record label Pentatone and so announced: "The Dresdner Philharmonie, Sächsischer Staatsopernchor Dresden and conductor Daniel Oren present Verdi’s masterpiece La Traviata, together with a stellar cast including René Barbera as Alfredo, Lester Lynch as Germont, and world star soprano Lisette Oropesa as Violetta."

== Controversy surrounding the Un'Estate da Re festival ==
The names of an Israeli conductor and the Russian conductor Valery Gergiev - a key supporter of Vladimir Poutine became embroiled in a heated controversry in 2025 during the Un'Estated da Re festival, held at the Royal Palace of Caserta. The concert, organized by the Campania Region and featuring the orchestra of the Salerno Opera - directed by Daniel Oren - had to be cancelled due to intense media pressure and sharp public criticism regarding Israeli policy in Gaza.

== See also ==
- Music of Israel
