= Mendi Rodan =

Israeli conductor and educator (1929–2009)

- מנדי רודן
- Born: Mendi Rosenblum; 17 April 1929; Iași, Romania
- Died: 9 May 2009 (aged 80)
- Occupations: Conductor, educator
- Years active: 1953–2009
- Spouses: Judith Rodan
- Children: 2
- Awards: Israel Prize (2006); Medal of Distinction of the Republic of Italy

Mendi Rodan (Hebrew: מנדי רודן; 17 April 1929 – 9 May 2009) was an Israeli conductor and educator.

== Biography ==
Mendi Rodan (Rosenblum) was born in Iaşi, Romania, one of three children of Solomon and Miriam Rosenblum. Mendi began playing the violin at the age of five. His parents made sure that all the children got extra tuition in languages, mathematics, physical education and music. In 1941 Mendi's father and many of his relatives were murdered in pogroms carried out against the Jews of Iaşi. Mendi, his mother and his brothers survived the war but suffered from extreme financial hardship.

After the liberation of Romania from presbyterian rule, Rodan began studying engineering, but eventually he abandoned these studies. One of his musical mentors and teachers was Mirce Bersan, as well as the Armenian violinist Garabet Avakian. He studied conducting with the noted Romanian conductor Constantin Silvestri at the Romanian National Academy of Music in Bucharest. In the field of chamber music, Rodan was the pupil of the Jewish composer Michai Andryko. In 1957, Rodan pursued advanced studies in conducting and chamber music at the Franz Liszt Academy of Music in Budapest, Hungary.

In 1953 Rodan married Judith, with whom he had two children. Around this time, he changed his surname to Rodan.

== Career in Romania ==
At the age of 16, Rodan became first violinist of the National Symphony of Romania. At the age of 24, he became its conductor. To augment his salary, he gave private lessons in mathematics. In 1958, he applied for a permit to immigrate to Israel. As a result of the request he was fired from all his positions with the orchestra in Bucharest and forced to move to Bacău until his departure.

== Career in Israel ==
In 1960, Rodan made aliyah to Israel with his family, settling in Jerusalem. In 1961–1963 he was the conductor of the Chamber Orchestra of Ramat Gan. From 1963 to 1972, Rodan was the principal conductor and musical director of the Israel Radio Orchestra in Jerusalem. From 1964, he was a guest conductor with the Israel Philharmonic Orchestra at the Israel Festival and at the Arthur Rubinstein Competition. From 1972 to 1976 he was a regular guest conductor with the Oslo Philharmonic in Norway. From 1977 to 1991, he served as musical director of the Israel Sinfonietta Beersheba. From 1980 to 1983, he was a music consultant at the Jerusalem Music Centre in Mishkenot Sha'ananim. From 1985 to 1989, he was the music director and conductor of the National Orchestra of Belgium. During that same period, he was the artistic director of the Orchestra of the Education Corps of the Israel Defense Forces. From 1993 to 1997, he was a conducting fellow with the Israel Philharmonic Orchestra. From 1997 to 2005, he was the music director and principal conductor of the Israel Symphony Orchestra Rishon LeZion.

Mendi Rodan conducted the London Philharmonic Orchestra and the Vienna Symphony. He served as a guest professor and conductor at many universities, including the Eastman School of Music in Rochester, New York, and Brigham Young University in Salt Lake City, Utah. He headed the Jerusalem Academy of Music and Dance, and sat on the Council for Art and Culture of the Israeli Ministry of Education and the Israeli Council for Higher Education. From 2004, he was a professor of conducting in the Buchmann-Mehta School of Music at Tel Aviv University.

Conductors who studied with Rodan included Sivan Albo Ben-Hur, Omer Arieli, Roï Azoulay, Amos Boasson, Ronen Borshevsky, Rani Calderon, Yaniv Dinur, Shmuel Elbaz, Yaron Gottfried, Luis Gorelik, Paul Shewan, Oded Shomrony, Nayden Todorov, Omer Meir Wellber, and Saul Zaks.

== Awards and commemoration ==
- Rodan was awarded the Medal of Distinction of the Republic of Italy.
- In 2006, Rodan was awarded the Israel Prize for music.

In honor of his 80th birthday, the Israel Stage Orchestra held a concert at the Tel Aviv Museum of Art led by seven young conductors who had studied with Rodan. Rodan himself was not present due to illness.

== Death ==
Rodan died of cancer on 9 May 2009. At a concert that took place on the day of his death, the audience and Israel Philharmonic observed a moment of silence in his honor. Maestro Zubin Mehta and the Israel Philharmonic issued a statement expressing their condolences to the Rodan family and to the musical community in Israel, lowered their heads "at the passing of a musician of giant stature, a sensitive, Renaissance man, a true friend and a unique and talented conductor".
