= No One (EP) =

No One 노원

EP by F.Cuz
- Released: 11 March 2010
- Recorded: 2009–2010
- Genres: Pop, dance
- Labels: CAN&J Entertainment

F.Cuz chronology
No One 노원 (2010)	Gorgeous (2010)

No One (Korean: 노원; stylized as NO ONE) is the first mini-album by South Korean boy band, F.Cuz. The album was released in physical and digital format on March 11, 2010. The Taiwanese version was released on May 21, 2010; this edition includes a Mandarin version of F.Cuz's debut single "Jiggy" featuring Taiwanese entertainer Kuo Shu-yao.

== Track listing ==
No One
No.	Title	Length
1.	"Go!"	3:24
2.	"No One" (노원)	3:13
3.	"너 때문에" (Neottaemune / Because of You)	3:34
4.	"BMG (Boy Meet Girl)" (돌아올지도 몰라)	3:16
5.	"Jiggy" (지기)	3:13
6.	"No One" (Instrumental)	3:13
Total length:		27:25

No One Special Asia Edition (Taiwan)
No.	Title	Length
1.	"Jiggy" (ft. Yao Yao [郭书瑶])	3:16
2.	"Go!"	3:24
3.	"No One" (노원)	3:13
4.	"너 때문에" (Neottaemune / Because of You)	3:34
5.	"BMG (Boy Meet Girl)" (돌아올지도 몰라)	3:16
6.	"Jiggy" (지기)	3:13
7.	"No One" (Instrumental)	3:13
8.	"Jiggy" (Instrumental)	3:15
Total length:		33:56

No One Special Asia Edition DVD (Taiwan)
No.	Title	Length
1.	"Music Videos: Jiggy (Korean), Jiggy (Taiwanese), No One"
2.	"BTS with F.Cuz in Taiwan"
3.	"Making of 'Jiggy' (Taiwanese) MV"
4.	"Mirrored 'Jiggy' Dance Practice"
