= F.Cuz =

South Korean boyband

- Origin: Seoul, South Korea
- Genres: K-pop; pop; dance
- Years active: 2010–present
- Labels: CAN&J Entertainment (South Korea); Seedmusic (Taiwan); Tunes Tracks/e-SUM (Japan); Tunes-Will Entertainment (South Korea); Independent
- Members: Jinon; Kan; Yejun; Daegeon; Raehyun; LeeU
- Website: Official website

F.Cuz (Korean: 포커즈, "Focus"), is a South Korean boy band that used to be managed by Tunes-Will Entertainment, and is now promoting as an independent group (before 2014 by CAN Entertainment). The group made their debut on January 8, 2010, with their first single, "Jiggy" on Music Bank. F.Cuz originally debuted as a four-member group (Jinon, LeeU, Kan, and Yejun), but LeeU made his departure on August 23, 2011, to pursue a solo career. F.Cuz promoted shortly as a three-member group in Japan, but were joined by new members Daegeon and Raehyun in 2012. Their contract with Tunes-Will expired in September 2016, and they are now independent. The official fanclub for F.Cuz is 'For U' and their color is Twinkle Light Silver. The meaning of the group is "A five-points star" as in five members that complete F.CUZ, and "U+U = F.CUZ+FORU" as in the group and their fans being one.

== History ==
=== Pre-debut ===
Jinon, Raehyun, Kan, and Yejun all attended the Anyang High School of Arts in Anyang; Jinon was their senior while Raehyun, Kan, and Yejun were in the same graduating class. While in Anyang, Jinon, Kan, and Yejun all participated in a dance team that had included famous K-Pop star Rain. Out of all the F.Cuz members who attended school in Anyang, Jinon had one of the busier pre-debut careers. In 2005, Jinon joined a project group named GM6, now known as Supernova, and began trainee activities. However, Jinon withdrew before their debut and suffered major health issues as a result; he battled depression and several eating disorders. Jinon also pursued acting and achieved some notoriety due to his similarities to Kwon Sang Woo. In 2009, he appeared in Cinderella Man as a younger version of Kwon Sang Woo's character. Jinon also had a role in SG Wannabe's "Gashiri" music video alongside T-ara's Eunjung.

Like Jinon, Raehyun and Kan also pursued acting. Raehyun's pre-debut career includes several dramas (Gloria, Over the Rainbow, Chosun Police (Season 3), Beautiful Life, and Rock, Rock, Rock), an appearance in the movie See You After School, and a Samyang ramen CF. Kan appeared in the dramas Soul and Assorted Gems.

LeeU had always been a witness to the music industry due to his father, the famous trot singer Sul Woon Do. From an early age, LeeU had wanted to pursue a singing career, so much so that he lost sixty pounds in one month during his first year of junior high. Later, LeeU became a successful ulzzang and appeared on many variety programs with his father. LeeU also had a short solo career under the name "U" (Korean: 唯); he appeared on the SBS Drama Gourmet OST with "Listen to You" (Korean: 그대를 듣죠) and featured on a song with Taru (Korean: 타루) called "오! 다시 (Oh! Again)."

Daegeon began his idol career under Xing Entertainment, a company most known for housing future members of U-KISS, Beast, and The Boss. Daegeon eventually moved on to Golden Goose Entertainment and debuted as a member of Double B 21, now known as Apeace. He participated in their S.O.S. promotions, but left the group shortly after.

=== 2010: Jiggy, No One, overseas activities, and Gorgeous ===
F.Cuz was officially announced by CAN&J Entertainment on December 6, 2009. Following the announcement, each day one member would introduce themselves to the public through a short video that showcased their talents; the videos amassed over 30,000 views. In anticipation of their debut, F.Cuz began filming the music video for "Jiggy," their debut release, on December 15, 2009. "Jiggy" was digitally released on January 8, 2010, and they held their debut performance the same day on KBS' Music Bank. In February, it was announced that F.Cuz had signed with Taiwanese label SEEDMUSIC to pursue activities overseas. On March 8, "Jiggy" was digitally released in Taiwan and Hong Kong. On March 11, 2010, F.Cuz made their Korean comeback with their first mini-album and title song "No One."

F.Cuz returned with a new album called "Gorgeous" with the title track "Midnight Sun" on November 18, 2010. They released another single from the album, "친구졸업 (Friend's Graduation), with the English title "Wanna Be Your Love". This song has a cute and bubbly image that completely contradicts the dark concept of "Midnight Sun". In January 2011, member Kan was involved in a serious car accident going back to Seoul after filming for the drama Athena: Goddess of War. He, his manager, and four other people in the car received major and minor injuries after the car slipped on ice and crashed, forcing the group to halt activities for their new song.

=== 2011–13: LeeU's withdrawal, For Century Ultimate Zest, Hello Again ===
On May 21, 2011, Can Entertainment announced that Lee-U would be leaving the group in August after releasing their Japanese debut single. The record company cited musical differences and Lee-U's desire to focus on a career as a solo singer. Can Entertainment and Lee-U's agency, Castle J Enterprise, came to an agreement to withdraw him from the group. The group added two new members, Daegeon and Raehyun, to replace Lee-U.

On April 27, 2012, F.Cuz released their new mini album "For Century Ultimate Zest." They made their comeback with promotions for the title track "NO. 1."

In August 2012, they released "꿈꾸는" (Dreaming I), a single.

In April 2013, F.Cuz returned to Japan with the single "Hello Again" along with a music video. On October 31, 2013, they released their 5th Japanese single, titled "Change". F.Cuz spent the rest of 2013 promoting in Japan.

=== 2014–2016: One Love, Bargaining for Love, Two of Us, Contract Expiration and U Concert ===
F.Cuz released a Korean single titled "One Love" on March 27, 2014. This marked their Korean comeback after almost 2 years since they spent most of 2013 promoting in Japan. The group left to Japan in July to promote the Japanese version of "One Love", "Feeling My Soul".

F.Cuz then released its fourth mini-album titled Bargaining for Love with the title track "Cha-Ga-Wa". The former peaked at number 18 on the Gaon Album Chart.

In December 2014, F.Cuz released its seventh Japanese single "もう一度だけ" (Remind). On July 21, 2015, F.Cuz released their 8th Japanese single "Two of Us." It reached a peak of #3 on the Oricon chart on July 25.

On September 12, 2016, it was announced through F.Cuz's fan-club that the members would not renew their contracts once they expired on September 30, leading them into becoming an independent group.

In October 18, they changed their logo and the meaning behind it to "A five-points star" as in five members that complete F.CUZ, and "U+U = F.CUZ+FORU" as in the group and their fans being one.

In November 1, they announced their Japanese Concert called 'U', and have been actively promoting since then.

== Members ==
=== Current ===
- Jinon (진온)
- Kan (칸)
- Yejun (예준)
- Daegeon (대건)
- Raehyun (래현)

=== Former ===
- LeeU (이유)

== Discography ==
=== Extended plays ===
Title	Album details	Peak chart positions		Sales
Title	Album details	KOR (Note: Week references for Gaon Album Chart: No One, Gorgeous, For Century Ultimate Zest, Bargaining for Love.)	JPN	Sales
No One	Released: March 11, 2010; Label: CAN&J Entertainment; Format: CD, digital download	10	—	
Gorgeous	Released: November 18, 2010; Label: CAN&J Entertainment; Format: CD, digital download	11	140	
For Century Ultimate Zest	Released: April 27, 2012; Label: Tunes-Will Entertainment; Format: CD, digital download	15	161	KOR: 2,413
Bargaining for Love	Released: September 17, 2014; Label: Tunes-Will Entertainment; Format: CD, digital download	18	—	KOR: 1,583

=== Singles ===
Title	Year	Peak chart positions			Sales	Album
Title	Year	KOR (Note: Week references for Gaon Digital Chart: "Jiggy", "No One", "Midnight Sun (Original Ver.)", "No.1", "Dreaming I".)	JPN	JPN Hot. (Note: Week references for Billboard Japan Hot 100: "Hello Again", "Change", "Feeling My Soul", "Mō Ichido Dake (Remind)", "Two of Us", "Forever".)	Sales	Album
Korean
"Jiggy" (지기; Jigi)	2010	111	—	—		No One
"No One"	2010	69	—	—		No One
"Midnight Sun (Original Ver.)"	2010	125	—	—		Gorgeous
"No.1"	2012	132	—	—	KOR: 43,613	For Century Ultimate Zest
"Dreaming I" (꿈꾸는 I; Kkumkkuneun I)	2012	140	—	—	KOR: 36,040	Non-album single
"One Love"	2014	—	—	—	KOR: 3,413	Non-album single
"Cha-Ga-Wa"	2014	—	—	—		Bargaining for Love
"Don't Touch (Korean Ver.)"	2015	—	—	—		Non-album single
"Love Or Truth"	2017	—	—	—		Non-album single
"Shine"	2020	—	—	—		Non-album single
"Summer Days"	2020	—	—	—		Non-album single
Dear.Me"	2024	—	—	—		Non-album single
Japanese						Non-album single
"Never Let You Go"	2011	—	37	—	JPN: 2,568	Non-album single
"Luv Holic/Around You"	2011	—	53	—		Non-album single
"Drawing Heart"	2012	—	39	—		Non-album single
"Hello Again"	2013	—	15	100	JPN: 8,148	Non-album single
"Change"	2013	—	11	53	JPN: 11,640	Non-album single
"Feeling My Soul"	2014	—	9	26	JPN: 12,482	Non-album single
"Mō Ichido Dake (Remind)" (もう一度だけ ～Remind～; "Just Once More (Remind)")	2014	—	7	30	JPN: 12,646	Non-album single
"Two of Us"	2015	—	9	23	JPN: 16,329	Non-album single
"Forever"	2016	—	13	52	JPN: 10,353	Non-album single
"Wonder World"	2016	—	—	—		Non-album single

==== Soundtrack appearances ====
List of soundtrack songs, showing year released and soundtrack name
Title	Year	Album	Ref.
"Let Me Love" (사랑하게 해주세요; Saranghage Haejuseyo)	2010	Secret Agent Miss Oh OST Part.2	
"What Planet" (어느 별에서; Eoneu Byeoreseo)	2014	KBS The Magic Thousand-Character Classic OST Part. 1 (What Planet)	
"This Is Love" (이게 사랑인가봐; Ige Sarangingabo)	2015	My Regrettable Boyfriend OST Part 1 My Regrettable Boyfriend OST	
"I Wanted to Say to You" (너에게 하고픈 말; Neoege Hagopeun Mal)	2015	Missing Korea OST Part.1; Missing Korea OST	
