= Concerto for Wind Ensemble (Bryant) =

Composition by Steven Bryant

The Concerto for Wind Ensemble is a concerto for wind ensemble in five movements by the American composer Steven Bryant.

== Composition ==
A performance of the work lasts approximately 33 minutes. The piece calls for sections of antiphonal players surrounding the audience.

=== Background ===
The first movement was originally commissioned as a stand-alone piece in 2006 by Commander Donald Schofield of the United States Air Force Band of Mid-America and premiered February 2007. However, as the work progressed, Bryant realized that he wanted to expand the piece beyond the parameter of its original commission and deliberately designed the composition as a first movement to a larger work. Later, he approached conductor Jerry Junkin about expanding the piece into a full Concerto for Wind Ensemble. Bryant commented on the inception and development of the work, saying:

As the piece took shape, I realized I wanted to write much more than the "five to seven minutes" specified in the original commission, so I intentionally left the end of the work "open," knowing I would someday expand it when the opportunity presented itself. That chance came in 2009, thanks to Jerry Junkin: shortly after his fantastic 2009 performance of Ecstatic Waters at the College Band Directors National Association conference in Austin, we discussed my desire to write more movements, and he graciously agreed to lead a consortium to commission the project.

The remaining four movements were jointly commissioned by a consortium of music schools, including the University of Miami Frost School of Music, and were completed in 2010. The complete Concerto for Wind Ensemble premiered October 27, 2010, with Junkin leading the University of Texas Wind Ensemble.

=== Instrumentation ===
The work is scored for five flutes (1st and 2nd doubling piccolo; 4th doubling alto flute and piccolo; 3rd and 5th antiphonal), two oboes, two bassoons (2nd doubling contrabassoon), six clarinets (3rd doubling E-flat clarinet; 4th, 5th, and 6th antiphonal), bass clarinet (doubling contrabass clarinet), two alto saxophones (1st doubling soprano saxophone), tenor Saxophone, baritone saxophone, six trumpets (1st, 2nd, and 5th doubling piccolo trumpet; 4th, 5th, and 6th antiphonal), four French horns (3rd and 4th antiphonal), four trombones, euphonium, tuba, harp, contrabass, and percussion.

== Reception ==
Lawrence Budmen of The Classical Review compared the virtuosity of the piece to Béla Bartók's Concerto for Orchestra and called it a "bravura ensemble vehicle." Budmen nevertheless gave the work mixed praise, writing:

The first fortissimo roar of the full ensemble and antiphonal forces perks up the ears. A moody horn solo over mallet percussion provides a striking interlude. The dense figurations of two flutes with tinkling harp dot the second movement. A jazz tune played on the trumpet by the composer’s father years ago becomes the principal thematic material of the light, dashing third movement. The gloomy heaviness of the following segment is considerably less appealing and the pealing brass chorales and full-throttle percussion of the conclusion sound like innumerable other contemporary fanfares. Ultimately, the fragments do not coalesce into a tightly conceived whole, and Bryant’s piece has more rhetoric than substance.
