= Les Prêtres =

French musical trio

- Origin: Gap and Embrun (Hautes-Alpes, France
- Genres: Religious music, Contemporary music
- Years active: 2010-present
- Labels: Universal Music Group
- Members: Jean-Michel Bardet; Charles Troesch; Joseph Dinh Nguyen Nguyen
- Website: www.les-pretres.fr

Les Prêtres (meaning The Priests in English) is the name of a musical trio created by the initiative of Mgr Jean-Michel di Falco. The project was inspired by the success of a similar Irish musical project called The Priests.

Les Prêtres has released the French chart-topping album Spiritus Dei (March 2010) on label TF1 Musique with the album certified a diamond disc for selling more than 500,000 copies. Later sales increased the figure to more than 800,000 copies. Les Prêtres is released their second album Gloria in April 2011. Both albums have been successes in France, Belgium and Switzerland.

== Career ==
After discussions with Didier Barbelivien, Mgr Jean-Michel di Falco Léandri, bishop of Gap and Embrun (Hautes-Alpes) proposed to two priests of the seminary of the Diocese of Gap and Embrun and a former member of the seminary, all from the Roman Catholic Diocese of Gap and Embrun to record a charity album to benefit two projects, one pastoral, to finance partially the construction of a church dedicated to Notre-Dame du Laus (in English Our Lady of Laus) in the diocese, and the other humanitarian, being financing of the construction of a school in Madagascar.

The three members in Les Prêtres are:

- Jean-Michel Bardet, (born 17 November 1964), of the parish of Gap Cathedral since 2004.
- Charles Troesch, (born 1 June 1982), ordained a priest in June 2009, and serving as a vicar of the Parish of Saint-Roch de Gap, later named chaplain of the Notre-Dame du Laus Basilica in September 2010
- Joseph Dinh Nguyen Nguyen, (born 5 December 1984), former seminary student in the diocese from 2004 to 2007).

The album Spiritus Dei stayed at the top of the SNEP French Albums Chart for 9 weeks. The only three albums in French music history to exceed this record since 2000 were the album Caravane de Raphaël (12 weeks at the top in 2005), the album Entre deux of Patrick Bruel (11 weeks in 2002), and Bruno Coulais for the film Les Choristes (also 11 weeks in 2004).

The album Gloria was also a success staying at the top of the French Albums Chart for a total of 5 weeks.

Joseph Dinh Nguyen Nguyen, after touring with Les Prêtres has declared that he was dropping out of the seminary after many years. But that he would stay committed to the project for now.

== Charity ==
Mgr Di Falco announced that as a result of great sales, financing had been provided up to €200,000 to Notre-Dame du Laus, another €100,000 to father Pedro in Madagascar for the school project and €50,000 to the Yves Duteil Association to help open a school in India.

Les Prêtres also took part in a collective live project at Cathedral de Rouen in June 2010 alongside "Les Copains d'Accords" and the children's "Les Petits Copains d'Accords", with a CD and a DVD of the event released on 1 December 2010.

In March 2015, the RATP Group refused to allow a poster for a concert Les Prêtres planned to hold to include information that the concert would be held for the benefit of Christians in the Middle East. The RATP Group said the poster's mention of sympathy with the Christians violated the group's standard on neutrality and secularity. This caused protests from the group and other public figures and a public debate over the issue. In April 2015, the RATP Group reversed their decision and allowed the original poster.

== Discography ==
=== Albums ===
Year	Album	Charts			Certification
Year	Album	BEL (Wa)	FR	SWI	Certification
2010	Spiritus Dei	5	1	32	FR: Diamond
2011	Gloria	1	1	19	FR: 3× Platinum
2014	Amen	5	1	-	
2015	L'essentiel	28	-	66	
