= The Child Dreams (opera) =

2010 opera by Gil Shohat

The Child Dreams (Hebrew: הילד חולם) is a 2010 opera by Gil Shohat, based on the play of the same name by Hanoch Levin.

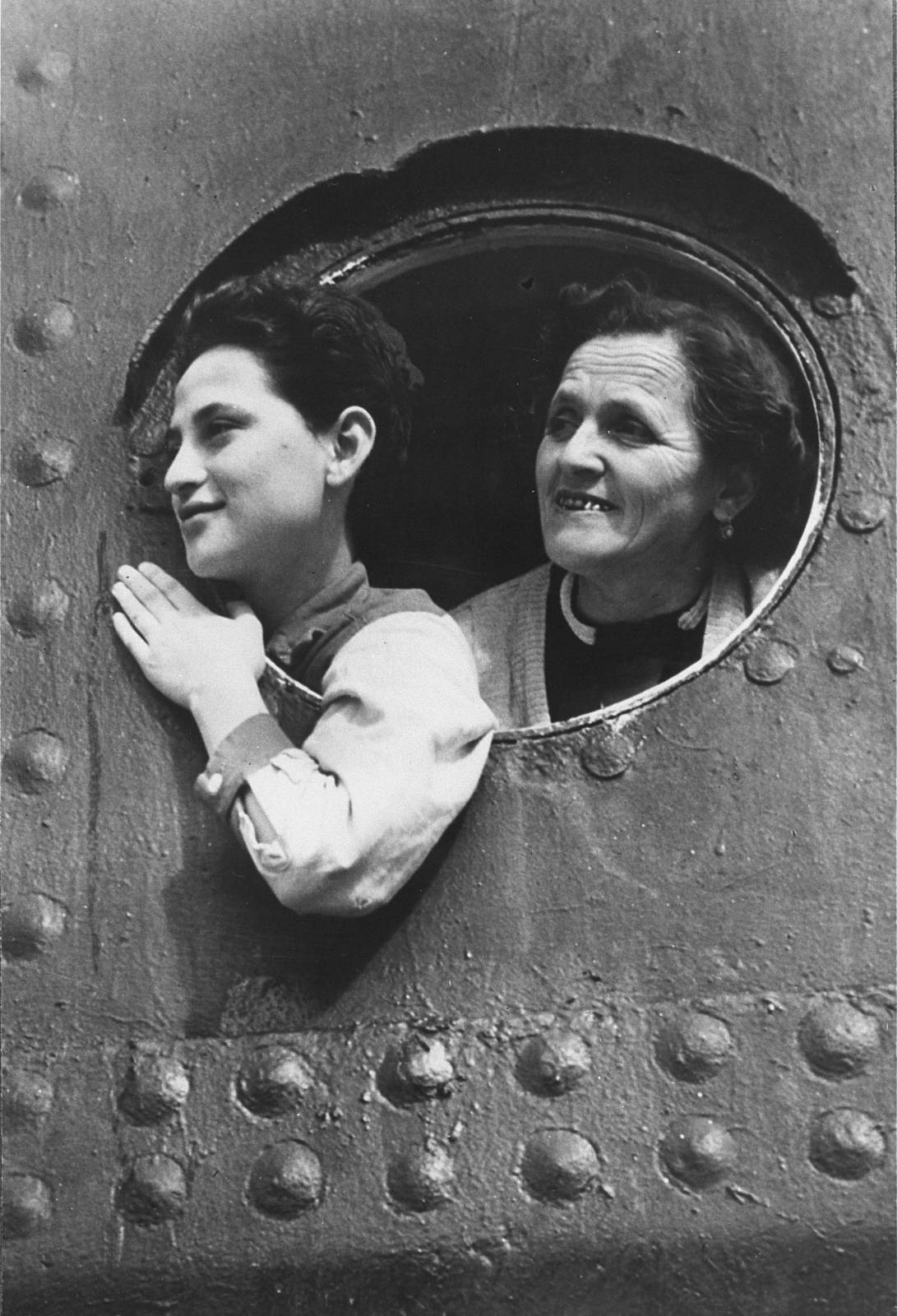
Jewish refugees

== History ==
The Child Dreams was commissioned by the Israeli Opera for its 25th anniversary season, one of a number of new operas commissioned by the company from Israeli composers. Levin's play, inspired by the MS St. Louis incident and the film Voyage of the Damned based on it, is considered one of the most important Israeli plays. When it premiered in 1993 under the direction of the playwright, Hanna Munitz, the director general of the Israeli Opera, wanted to make it an opera. Director Omri Nitzan, who had directed operas for the Israeli Opera and Levin's plays in Israel and abroad, approached Levin about having Shohat compose the opera. Levin gave Shohat his permission shortly before his death, and Shohat, who also knew upon seeing the play that he wanted to adapt it into an opera, began working on the music. Shohat's opera is the first operatic adaptation of a Levin work. Shohat and Nitzan adapted the Hebrew-language libretto from Levin's text, making only slight cuts. Munitz hired designer Gottfried Helnwein for the production after seeing his work, which features images of hurt children, in Los Angeles.

The opera had its world premiere in Tel Aviv on January 18, 2010 in a production directed by Nitzan, conducted by Israeli Opera music director David Stern and with sets and costumes by Helnwein. Besides being the Israeli Opera's 25th anniversary season, it was also Tel Aviv's centennial and the tenth anniversary of Levin's death. Unlike most previous Israeli Opera productions, which for many years had no Israeli principals, the entire cast was Israeli. The role of the child was sung by soprano Hila Baggio, but played by acrobats May Poleg and Yuval Lifsitz; the use of a child singer was considered, and strongly supported by the designer Helnwein, but ultimately an adult singer was chosen for logistical reasons including legal aspects of hiring child performers.

Helnwein's designs included the large face of a sleeping child as the backdrop for the first act, through which soldiers broke, and the bodies of dead children—some dummies, some acrobats—suspended above the stage in the fourth act. The opera's premiere coincided with an art exhibition by Helnwein originally created to commemorate Kristallnacht and titled Selektion, which depicted children lined up as though in a concentration camp. In 2012, a documentary about Helnwein's designs for the opera, titled Gottfried Helnwein and the Dreaming Child, was released to poor reviews, which criticized it for containing little material about the opera itself and instead promoting Helnwein.

Shohat denies that The Child Dreams is a Holocaust opera, saying that its themes are universal and that the Holocaust is not a subject that should be presented artistically.

== Roles ==
Role	Voice type	World premiere cast, 18 January 2010 (Conductor: David Stern)
Father	tenor	Guy Mannheim
Mother	soprano	Ira Bertman
Child	soprano	Hila Baggio
Bleeding Man	speaker	Rami Baruch
Shocked Observer	baritone	Vladimir Braun
Commander	baritone	Noah Briger
Woman Born to Love	mezzo-soprano	Bracha Kol
Wailing Woman	soprano	Lilia Gretsova
Captain	baritone	Noah Briger
Comforting Woman	mezzo-soprano	Karin Shifrin
Immigration Officer	baritone	Sorin Semilian
Crippled Youth	mezzo-soprano	Shira Raz
Governor	tenor	Guy Mannheim
Dead Child	soprano	Einat Aronstein
The Messiah	silent	Unknown
Acrobats, Female nonet (3 soprano, 3 mezzo, 3 alto): Choir of the Pursued, Dead Children.

== Plot ==
=== Act 1: The Father ===
While a father and mother watch over their sleeping child, people fleeing war and persecution fill their house. One, a bleeding violinist wounded by gunfire, dies by the child's bed. Troops enter the house along with their commander and his mistress; the dead violinist is the first corpse she has ever seen. The commander wakes the child, and the soldiers become clowns to amuse him. The Woman Born to Love, the commander's mistress, humiliates and then shoots the father for the fun of it. The commander allows the mother and child to escape.

=== Act 2: The Mother ===
The mother and child try to take a refugee ship across the border, but the captain will only let them aboard if the mother sleeps with him. While the captain and the mother are in the captain's cabin, a woman on deck comforts the child.

=== Act 3: The Child ===
The ship arrives at a ghost-like island, but the refugees are not allowed to land. One of the island's inhabitants is a young, crippled poet who writes about the refugee ships he sees approaching and being sent away from the island. The governor of the island decides, as a public relations move, to allow the child to enter, and the mother tries to persuade him to leave her so he can be safe, but he does not understand why she seems to want to abandon him, and he refuses to leave her, choosing death instead of separation. The ship sails away.

=== Act 4: The Messiah ===
The final scene departs from the realism of the previous scenes. The mother lays the dead body of her child among the bodies of other children, who are waiting for the arrival of the Messiah and believe that with the addition of one more dead child will come the resurrection of the dead. A persecuted man enters, and the children, believing he is the Messiah, beg him to resurrect them, but he is really only a traveling salesman. The soldiers and their commander enter, and the commander shoots the "Messiah." The commander takes the mother away to have sex with her, and one of the dead children tells the mother's child that he will slowly lose the will to live again.

== Music ==
The opera is scored for a reduced orchestra and piano: piccolo, flute, 2 oboes, clarinet, bass clarinet, bassoon, contrabassoon, 2 horns, 2 trumpets, trombone, piano, celesta, harp, percussions(timpani, vibraphone, xylophone, glockenspiel, tubular bells, triangle, bass drum, ratchet, small side drum, tambourine, tam-tam, wood blocks, cymbal), and strings (particularly the high ranges of some of these instruments and of the soprano voice). The orchestral music is late-Romantic in style, rejecting avant-garde techniques and influenced by composers like Wagner, Strauss, Ravel, and early Stravinsky. The vocal music generally resembles recitative or Sprechgesang, though the mother's and child's parts are sometimes more expressive. In general, the score is lyrical and musically conservative, with few innovations and frequent use of clichés.

The opera's overture opens with an unaccompanied female nonet. The first act is dominated by the orchestra, while vocal music predominates in the act. In the fourth and final act, the female nonet provides the voices of the dead children.
