= Gil Shohat =

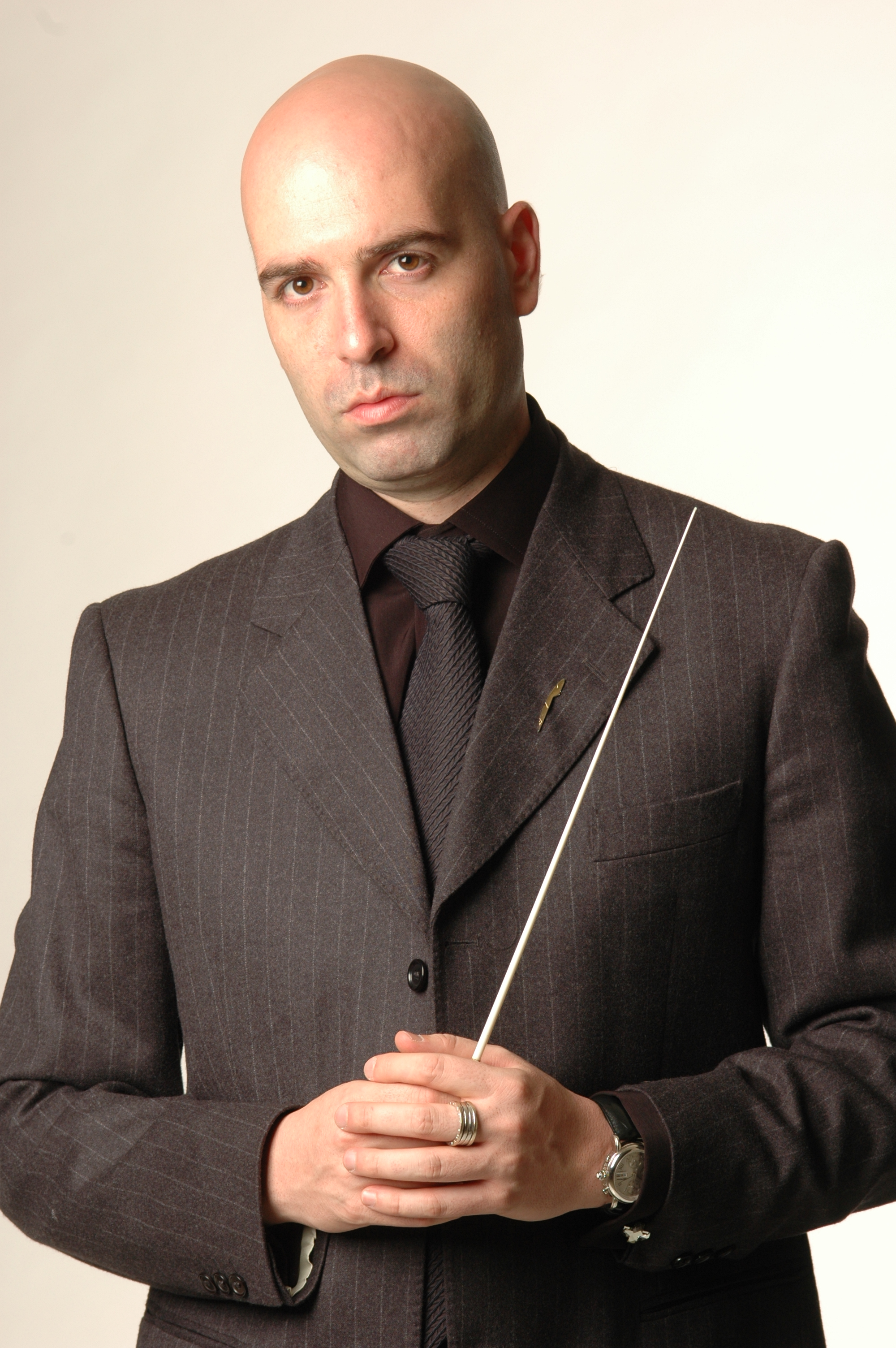
Gil Shohat

Gil Shohat (Hebrew: גיל שוחט; born 7 September 1973) is an Israeli classical music composer, conductor, pianist and lecturer.

== Biography ==
Gil Shohat was born in Tel Aviv. His mother is Ha'aretz theatre critic Tzipora (Tzipi) Shohat. He grew up in Ramat Gan. As a child, he attended a music program for gifted children at Tel Aviv University. His father is an Iraqi Jew. He earned his BM and MM from the Buchmann-Mehta School of Music at Tel Aviv University in 1991-1995. In 1995-1997, he studied piano and composition at the Accademia Nazionale di Santa Cecilia in Rome, and the following year studied with Alexander Goehr of Cambridge University. Shohat lives in Jaffa with his life partner.

== Music career ==
His first orchestral work was performed by the Israel Chamber Orchestra when he was 18. In the army, he served as commander of the Israel Defense Forces Chamber Orchestra. Shohat has composed numerous symphonies, concertos, operas, and chamber and solo compositions.

== Awards and recognition ==
Shohat was named Knight in the Order of Arts and Letters of France in 2009.

== Selected works ==
Shohat's works are published by Casa Ricordi, Israel Music Institute, Israeli Music Center, OR-TAV Music Publications and Gil Shohat Editions.

Music for the stage

- The Happy Prince, Musical tale for children (1997)
- Alpha and Omega, Opera (2001) This opera is credited with transforming the Israeli classical music scene because it was the first piece by an Israeli composer to draw audiences in the tens of thousands.
- Max and Moritz, Operatic musical for children (2002)
- Tyre and Jerusalem, Music for the theater (2003)
- Badenheim, Music for the theater (2006)
- The Devil's Dance, Ballet (2006)
- The Child Dreams, Opera (2010)

Orchestral

- O Ye Dry Bones (1995)
- Symphony No. 1 Israel Symphony for soprano (or tenor), choir and orchestra (1998)
- Symphony No. 2 Alpha and Omega (1997–1999)
- Symphony No. 3 The Symphony of Fire (1998)
- Symphony No. 4 The Symphony of Lights (2000)
- Symphony No. 5 German Symphony for soprano, child's voice, choir and orchestra (2000)
- Symphony No. 6 The Cantata of Ecstasy for soprano, mezzo-soprano, children's choir and orchestra (2000)
- Symphony No. 7 (2001)
- Symphony No. 8 Sacred Symphony for soprano, tenor, choir and orchestra (2002)
- Symphony No. 9 (2003)
- The Rest Is Silence for string orchestra or string quartet (2006)

Concertante

- Concertino for piano and orchestra (1993)
- Concertino for violin and orchestra (1995)
- Concerto for clarinet and orchestra (1998)
- Concerto for viola and orchestra (1998)
- Concerto for cello and orchestra (2000)
- Concerto No. 2 for piano and orchestra (2001)
- Concerto for flute and string orchestra (2002)
- Concerto for oboe and string orchestra (2002)
- Concerto for piano four hands and Orchestra (2006)
- Concerto for guitar and string orchestra (2007)
- Concerto for saxophone and string orchestra (2008)

Chamber music

- Anekdotos I: Choral for harp (2000)
- Anekdotos II: Theme and Variations for violin (2000)
- Anekdotos III: Rêverie et Cauchmard for viola (2000)
- Anekdotos IV: Hora Danza for cello (2000)
- Anekdotos V: Organum Mortum for double bass (2000)
- Anekdotos VI: Fantasia for piccolo (2000)
- Anekdotos VII: Mephisto Waltz for flute (2000)
- Anekdotos VIII: Ballade for oboe (2000)
- Anekdotos IX: Lied for English horn (2000)
- Anekdotos X: Klezmer for clarinet (2000)
- Anekdotos XI: Menuet for bassoon (2000)
- Anekdotos XII: Fanfare for trumpet (2000)
- Anekdotos XIII: Nocturne for horn (2000)
- Anekdotos XIV: Prelude "Alla Bachiana" for trombone (2000)
- Anekdotos XV: March Funebre for tuba (2000)
- Anekdotos XVI: Perpeuum Mobile Interrompu for marimba (2000)
- Quintet for clarinet and string quartet (2005)
- Septet for flute, oboe, clarinet, violin, viola, cello and double bass (2006)
- Badenheim Grand Suite, Octet for 3 violins, 2 violas, 2 cellos and double bass (2007)

Piano

- 9 Early Piano Pieces (1985–1987)
- Three Waltzes (1989)
- Three Improvisations on Paintings (1989)
- The Kiss of Salome (1990)
- Circles, 6 Short Methodological Pieces (1993)
- Piano Sonata (1993)
- Sparks from the Beyond (1996)
- Three Studies (1997)

Vocal

- Five Songs of Darkness for soprano, viola and piano (1990)
- Pirkei Avot (Proverbs of Our Fathers), 7 Short Songs for soprano and piano (1991)
- Bright Winter, 3 Songs for soprano, flute and piano (1997)
- Vocalisa for soprano and chamber ensemble (1997)
- The Song of Songs, Cantata for soprano, tenor, choir and orchestra (1997)
- Ophelie for soprano and piano or orchestra (2003)
- Michal, 4 Songs for soprano and orchestra (2006)
- Stabat Mater for mezzo-soprano and orchestra (2006)
- Dharma for 3 singers, percussion, piano, mandolin, harp and strings ensemble (2014)

== See also ==
- Music of Israel
