= List of number-one digital albums of 2011 (Australia) =

ARIA Charts number-one digital albums of 2011 < 2010 2012 >

Other Australian number-one charts of 2011
- albums
- singles
- urban singles
- dance singles
- club tracks
- digital tracks

Top Australian singles and albums of 2011
- Triple J Hottest 100
- top 25 singles
- top 25 albums

The ARIA Albums Chart ranks the best-performing albums and extended plays (EPs) in Australia. Its data, published by the Australian Recording Industry Association, is based collectively on the weekly digital sales of albums and EPs.

== Chart history ==
Date	Album	Artist(s)	Ref.
3 January	I Believe You Liar	Washington	
10 January	My Beautiful Dark Twisted Fantasy	Kanye West	
17 January	My Beautiful Dark Twisted Fantasy	Kanye West	
24 January	Burlesque: Original Motion Picture Soundtrack	Cher and Christina Aguilera	
31 January	21	Adele	
7 February	21	Adele	
14 February	Zonoscope	Cut Copy	
21 February	Aftermath	Hillsong United	
28 February	21	Adele	
7 March	The Experiment	Art vs. Science	
14 March	Lasers	Lupe Fiasco	
21 March	Glee: The Music, Volume 5	Glee Cast	
28 March	Angles	The Strokes	
4 April	Femme Fatale	Britney Spears	
11 April	The Life of Riley	Drapht	
18 April	Wasting Light	Foo Fighters	
25 April	21	Adele	
2 May	This Modern Glitch	The Wombats	
9 May	21	Adele	
16 May	21	Adele	
23 May	21	Adele	
30 May	Born This Way	Lady Gaga	
6 June	21	Adele	
13 June	21	Adele	
20 June	21	Adele	
27 June	21	Adele	
4 July	21	Adele	
11 July	21	Adele	
18 July	21	Adele	
25 July	21	Adele	
1 August	21	Adele	
8 August	21	Adele	
15 August	Watch the Throne	Jay-Z and Kanye West	
22 August	21	Adele	
29 August	Making Mirrors	Gotye	
5 September	Making Mirrors	Gotye	
12 September	21	Adele	
19 September	21	Adele	
26 September	Prisoner	The Jezabels	
3 October	Neighborhoods	Blink-182	
10 October	21	Adele	
17 October	21	Adele	
24 October	The Best of Cold Chisel	Cold Chisel	
31 October	Mylo Xyloto	Coldplay	
7 November	Ceremonials	Florence and the Machine	
14 November	Ceremonials	Florence and the Machine	
21 November	+	Ed Sheeran	
28 November	Here and Now	Nickelback	
5 December	Moonfire	Boy & Bear	
12 December	Christmas	Michael Bublé	
19 December	Christmas	Michael Bublé	
26 December	Christmas	Michael Bublé	

== Number-one artists ==
Position	Artist	Weeks at No. 1
1	Adele	22
2	Kanye West	3
2	Michael Bublé	3
3	Florence and the Machine	2
3	Gotye	2
4	Art vs. Science	1
4	Blink-182	1
4	Boy & Bear	1
4	Britney Spears	1
4	Cher	1
4	Christina Aguilera	1
4	Coldplay	1
4	Cut Copy	1
4	Drapht	1
4	Ed Sheeran	1
4	Glee Cast	1
4	Hillsong United	1
4	Jay-Z	1
4	Jezabels	1
4	Lady Gaga	1
4	Lupe Fiasco	1
4	Meghan Washington	1
4	Nickelback	1
4	The Strokes	1
4	The Wombats	1

== See also ==
- 2011 in music
- ARIA Charts
- List of number-one singles of 2011 (Australia)
