= List of number-one urban albums of 2011 (Australia) =

ARIA Charts number-one urban albums of 2011 < 2010 2012 >

Other Australian number-one charts of 2011
- albums
- singles
- urban singles
- dance singles
- club tracks
- digital tracks

Top Australian singles and albums of 2011
- Triple J Hottest 100
- top 25 singles
- top 25 albums

This is a list of albums that reached number-one on the ARIA Urban Albums Chart in 2011. The ARIA Urban Albums Chart is a weekly chart that ranks the best-performing urban albums in Australia. It is published by the Australian Recording Industry Association (ARIA), an organisation that collects music data for the weekly ARIA Charts. To be eligible to appear on the chart, the recording must be an album of a predominantly urban nature.

== Chart history ==
Issue date	Album	Artist(s)	Reference
3 January	Loud	Rihanna	
10 January	Doo-Wops & Hooligans	Bruno Mars	
17 January	Doo-Wops & Hooligans	Bruno Mars	
24 January	Doo-Wops & Hooligans	Bruno Mars	
31 January	Doo-Wops & Hooligans	Bruno Mars	
7 February	Doo-Wops & Hooligans	Bruno Mars	
14 February	Loud	Rihanna	
21 February	Loud	Rihanna	
28 February	Loud	Rihanna	
7 March	Loud	Rihanna	
14 March	Loud	Rihanna	
21 March	Anthems: 30 Years of Hip Hop	Various Artists	
28 March	F.A.M.E.	Chris Brown	
4 April	Anthems: 30 Years of Hip Hop	Various Artists	
11 April	The Life of Riley	Drapht	
18 April	The Life of Riley	Drapht	
25 April	Doo-Wops & Hooligans	Bruno Mars	
2 May	Doo-Wops & Hooligans	Bruno Mars	
9 May	Doo-Wops & Hooligans	Bruno Mars	
16 May	Doo-Wops & Hooligans	Bruno Mars	
23 May	Doo-Wops & Hooligans	Bruno Mars	
30 May	Doo-Wops & Hooligans	Bruno Mars	
6 June	Doo-Wops & Hooligans	Bruno Mars	
13 June	Doo-Wops & Hooligans	Bruno Mars	
20 June	Doo-Wops & Hooligans	Bruno Mars	
27 June	Hell: The Sequel	Bad Meets Evil	
4 July	4	Beyoncé	
11 July	4	Beyoncé	
18 July	4	Beyoncé	
25 July	Doo-Wops & Hooligans	Bruno Mars	
1 August	Doo-Wops & Hooligans	Bruno Mars	
8 August	Doo-Wops & Hooligans	Bruno Mars	
15 August	Watch the Throne	Jay-Z & Kanye West	
22 August	Watch the Throne	Jay-Z & Kanye West	
29 August	Watch the Throne	Jay-Z & Kanye West	
5 September	Watch the Throne	Jay-Z & Kanye West	
12 September	Tha Carter IV	Lil Wayne	
19 September	Doo-Wops & Hooligans	Bruno Mars	
26 September	The Quickening	Funkoars	
3 October	Future History	Jason Derulo	
10 October	Falling & Flying	360	
17 October	Falling & Flying	360	
24 October	Future History	Jason Derulo	
31 October	Future History	Jason Derulo	
7 November	Crave Vol. 6 – Mixed by DJ Havana Brown	Various Artists	
14 November	Crave Vol. 6 – Mixed by DJ Havana Brown	Various Artists	
21 November	Crave Vol. 6 – Mixed by DJ Havana Brown	Various Artists	
28 November	Talk That Talk	Rihanna	
5 December	Talk That Talk	Rihanna	
12 December	Lioness: Hidden Treasures	Amy Winehouse	
19 December	Lioness: Hidden Treasures	Amy Winehouse	
26 December	Doo-Wops & Hooligans	Bruno Mars	

== See also ==
- 2011 in music
- List of number-one albums of 2011 (Australia)
