= List of number-one country albums of 2011 (Australia) =

ARIA Charts number-one country albums of 2011 < 2010 2012 >

Other Australian number-one charts of 2011
- albums
- singles
- urban singles
- dance singles
- club tracks
- digital tracks

Top Australian singles and albums of 2011
- Triple J Hottest 100
- top 25 singles
- top 25 albums

These are the Australian Country number-one albums of 2011, per the ARIA Charts.

Issue date	Album	Artist
3 January	Speak Now	Taylor Swift
10 January	Speak Now	Taylor Swift
17 January	Speak Now	Taylor Swift
24 January	Speak Now	Taylor Swift
31 January	Cream Of Country Vol.14	Various artists
7 February	Cream Of Country Vol.14	Various artists
14 February	Cream Of Country Vol.14	Various artists
21 February	Need You Now	Lady Antebellum
28 February	Need You Now	Lady Antebellum
7 March	Need You Now	Lady Antebellum
14 March	34 Number Ones	Alan Jackson
21 March	34 Number Ones	Alan Jackson
28 March	Need You Now	Lady Antebellum
4 April	Need You Now	Lady Antebellum
11 April	Need You Now	Lady Antebellum
18 April	Need You Now	Lady Antebellum
25 April	Need You Now	Lady Antebellum
2 May	Need You Now	Lady Antebellum
9 May	Need You Now	Lady Antebellum
16 May	Need You Now	Lady Antebellum
23 May	Need You Now	Lady Antebellum
30 May	Need You Now	Lady Antebellum
6 June	Need You Now	Lady Antebellum
13 June	Ukulele Songs	Eddie Vedder
20 June	Ukulele Songs	Eddie Vedder
27 June	Play On	Carrie Underwood
4 July	Play On	Carrie Underwood
11 July	Play On	Carrie Underwood
18 July	Falling Into Place	Adam Harvey
25 July	Falling Into Place	Adam Harvey
1 August	Double Cream - The Best Of Cream Of Country Volume 3	Various artists
8 August	Double Cream - The Best Of Cream Of Country Volume 3	Various artists
15 August	Double Cream - The Best Of Cream Of Country Volume 3	Various artists
22 August	Double Cream - The Best Of Cream Of Country Volume 3	Various artists
29 August	101 Country Classics	Various artists
5 September	101 Country Classics	Various artists
12 September	101 Country Classics	Various artists
19 September	101 Country Classics	Various artists
26 September	Own the Night	Lady Antebellum
3 October	Own the Night	Lady Antebellum
10 October	Ultimate Hits	Lee Kernaghan
17 October	Ultimate Hits	Lee Kernaghan
24 October	Ultimate Hits	Lee Kernaghan
31 October	Ultimate Hits	Lee Kernaghan
7 November	Ultimate Hits	Lee Kernaghan
14 November	The Ray Hadley Country Music collection Volume 2	Various artists
21 November	The Very Best of Dolly Parton	Dolly Parton
28 November	Better Day	Dolly Parton
5 December	Speak Now World Tour – Live	Taylor Swift
12 December	The Ray Hadley Country Music Collection Volume 2	Various artists
19 December	The Ray Hadley Country Music Collection Volume 2	Various artists
26 December	Own the Night	Lady Antebellum

== See also ==
- 2011 in music
- List of number-one albums of 2011 (Australia)
