= Boy & Bear discography =

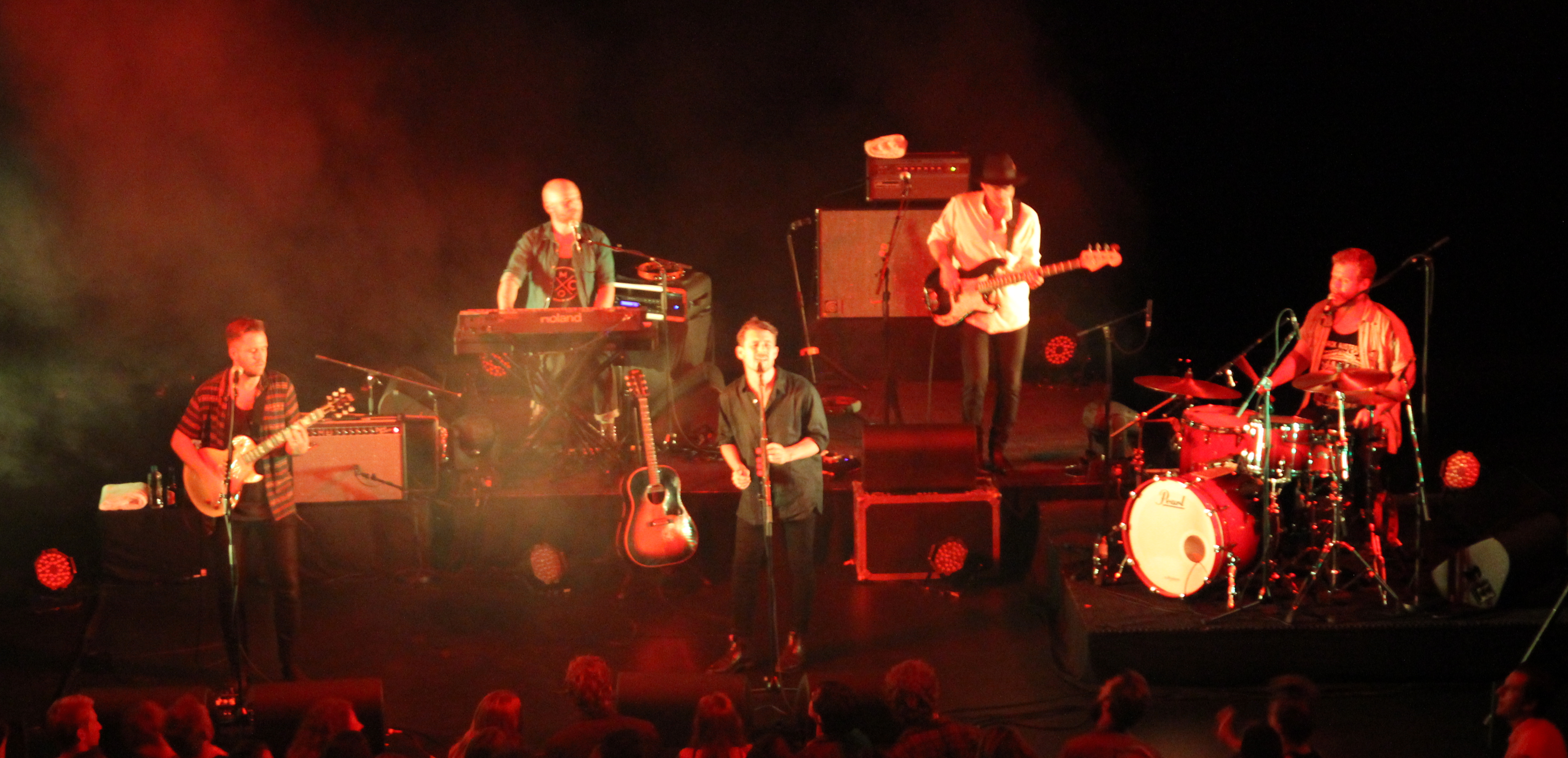
- Boy and Bear in February 2016
- Studio albums: 6
- EPs: 3
- Live albums: 1

The discography of Australian indie rock band Boy & Bear consists of six studio albums, one live album and three extended plays.

== Albums ==
=== Studio albums ===
List of studio albums, with selected chart positions and certifications shown
Title	Details	Peak chart positions				Certifications
Title	Details	AUS	BEL (FL)	NL	NZ	Certifications
Moonfire	Released: 5 August 2011; Label: Island, Universal; Formats: CD, digital download	2	—	91	—	ARIA: 2× Platinum
Harlequin Dream	Released: 16 August 2013; Label: Island, Universal; Formats: CD, LP, digital download	1	80	—	—	ARIA: 3× Platinum
Limit of Love	Released: 9 October 2015; Label: Island, Universal; Formats: CD, LP, digital download	1	—	83	31	ARIA: Gold
Suck on Light	Released: 27 September 2019; Label: Island, Universal; Formats: CD, LP, digital download, streaming	7	—	—	—	
Boy & Bear	Released: 26 May 2023; Label: Boy & Bear; Formats: CD, LP, digital download, streaming	4	—	—	—	
Tripping Over Time	Released: 12 December 2025; Label: Boy & Bear; Formats: CD, LP, digital download, streaming	13	—	—	—	
"—" denotes a recording that did not chart or was not released in that territory.

=== Live albums ===
List of studio albums, with selected chart positions and certifications shown
Title	Details	Peak chart positions
Title	Details	AUS
At Golden Retriever Studio	Released: 4 September 2020; Label: Island, Universal; Formats: CD, LP, digital download, streaming	162

== Extended plays ==
Title	Details	Peak chart positions
Title	Details	AUS
With Emperor Antarctica	Released: 7 May 2010; Label: Chess Club; Formats: CD, digital download	63
iTunes Live from Sydney	Released: 4 November 2011; Label: Island, Universal; Format: Digital download	—
Lost Dreams	Released: 15 September 2023; Label: Boy & Bear; Format: Digital download	—
"—" denotes a recording that did not chart or was not released in that territory.

== Singles ==
Title	Year	Peak positions			Certifications	Album
Title	Year	AUS	BEL (FL)	FRA	Certifications	Album
"The Storm"	2009	radio promo				With Emperor Antarctica
"Mexican Mavis"	2009	—	—	—		With Emperor Antarctica
"Rabbit Song"	2010	—	—	—		With Emperor Antarctica
"Blood to Gold"	2010	—	—	—		With Emperor Antarctica
"Fall at Your Feet"	2010	34	—	—	ARIA: 3× Platinum; RMNZ: Gold	He Will Have His Way
"Maryanne" (Georgia Fair featuring Lisa Mitchell & Boy & Bear)	2011	—	—	—		Times Fly
"Feeding Line"	2011	46	— (Note: "Feeding Line" did not reach the Ultratop chart, but peaked at number 27 on the Ultratip chart.)	—	ARIA: 2× Platinum	Moonfire
"Milk & Sticks"	2011	100	—	—		Moonfire
"Part Time Believer"	2011	107	—	—	ARIA: Gold	Moonfire
"Big Man"	2012	—	—	—		Moonfire
"Southern Sun"	2013	63	—	82	ARIA: 3× Platinum; RMNZ: Platinum	Harlequin Dream
"Three Headed Woman"	2013	—	—	—		Harlequin Dream
"Harlequin Dream"	2013	—	—	—		Harlequin Dream
"Bridges"	2014	—	—	—		Harlequin Dream
"Walk the Wire"	2015	121	—	—	ARIA: Gold	Limit of Love
"A Thousand Faces"	2015	—	—	—		Limit of Love
"Limit of Love"	2016	—	—	—		Limit of Love
"Where'd You Go"	2016	—	—	—		Limit of Love
"Hold Your Nerve"	2019	—	—	—	ARIA: Gold	Suck on Light
"Suck on Light"	2019	—	—	—		Suck on Light
"Telescope"	2019	—	—	—		Suck on Light
"Telescope" (acoustic)	2020	—	—	—		At Golden Retriever Studios
"Wicked Game"	2020	—	—	—	ARIA: Gold	At Golden Retriever Studios
"Bad People" (acoustic)	2020	—	—	—		At Golden Retriever Studios
"Southern Sun" (acoustic)	2020	—	—	—		At Golden Retriever Studios
"State of Flight"	2022	—	—	—		Boy & Bear
"Just to Be Kind"	2022	—	—	—		Boy & Bear
"Apex"	2023	—	—	—		Boy & Bear
"Silver Moon"	2023	—	—	—		Boy & Bear
"Strange World"	2023	—	—	—		Boy & Bear
"Abraham"	2023	—	—	—		Lost Dreams
"Feel"	2023	—	—	—		Non-album singles
"Magnus II"	2024	—	—	—		Non-album singles
"Want You" (with Boo Seeka)	2024	—	—	—		Non-album singles
"Science" (with Boo Seeka)	2024	—	—	—		Non-album singles
"High Up" (with Boo Seeka)	2025	—	—	—		Non-album singles
"Fever" (Cristóvam featuring Boy & Bear)	2025	—	—	—		Desert of Fools
"Where Does Life Begin" / "Vertigo"	2025	—	—	—		Tripping Over Time
"Tripping Over Time"	2025	—	—	—		Tripping Over Time
"Roses" / "Lost Control"	2025	—	—	—		Tripping Over Time
"Coming Up for Air"	2026	—	—	—		Tripping Over Time (Deluxe)
