= 2011 in Asian music =

== Events ==
- May 9 – Chinese musician and composer Gao Xiaosong is arrested after causing a road accident in Beijing. He receives a six-month jail sentence and loses his place as a judge in the new China's Got Talent series.
- July 25 – China's Got Talent is broadcast for the first time, by Dragon Television.

== Albums ==
- AKB48 – Koko ni Ita Koto (Japan)
- Aynur Aydın – Emanet Beden (Turkey)
- Anne Curtis – Annebisyosa (Philippines)
- Dinesh Agrahari Deewana, Mamta Sharma and Indu Sonali – Jaan Marbu Ka (India)
- Bülent Ersoy – Aşktan Sabıkalı (Turkey)
- Ethnix – Ga'aguim (Israel)
- Gugun Blues Shelter – Satu Untuk Berbagi (Indonesia)
- Leessang – Asura Balbalta (South Korea)
- Nima Rumba – Rangau Ki Ma (Nepal)
- Erik Santos – Awit Para Sa'yo (Philippines)
- Ali Zafar – Jhoom (Pakistan)

== Classical ==
- Mehdi Hosseini – Monodies

== Opera ==
- The Chinese Orphan, by Lei Lei, with a libretto by Zou Jingzhi
- Dr. Sun Yat-sen, by Huang Ruo, with libretto by Candace Mui-ngam Chong. It is her first opera libretto,

== Deaths ==
- January 3 – Suchitra Mitra, Indian singer, 86
- January 19 – Hira Devi Waiba, Nepali folk singer, 71 (injuries from a fire)
- January 24 – Bhimsen Joshi, Indian classical vocalist, 88
- February 8 – Roza Baglanova, Kazakh singer, People's Artist of the USSR, 89 (Russian)
- February 20 – Malaysia Vasudevan, Indian actor and playback singer, 66
- April 21 – Yoshiko Tanaka, Japanese actress and singer (Candies), 55 (breast cancer)
- April 29 – Vladimir Krainev, Russian pianist, People's Artist of the USSR, 67 (aortic aneurysm)
- May 23 – Pilu Momtaz, Bangladeshi pop singer, 52
- May 31 – Ram Man Trishit, Nepali lyricist, 70 (kidney problems)
- June 5 – Azam Khan, Bangladeshi pop singer, 61 (cancer)
- June 14 – Asad Ali Khan, Indian musician, 74
- July 27 – Rei Harakami, Japanese musician, 40 (cerebrovascular disease)
- December 8 – Minoru Miki, 81, Japanese composer

== See also ==
- 2011 in music
- 2011 in Japanese music
- 2011 in South Korean music
- List of 2011 albums
