= List of top 25 albums for 2011 in Australia =

Top 25 albums of 2011 < 2010 2012 >

Other Australian top charts for 2011
- top 25 singles
- Triple J Hottest 100

Australian number-one charts of 2011
- albums
- singles
- urban singles
- dance singles
- club tracks
- digital tracks

The following lists the top 25 albums of 2011 in Australia from the Australian Recording Industry Association (ARIA) End of Year Albums Chart.

#	Title	Artist	Highest pos. reached	Weeks at No. 1
1.	21	Adele	1	23 (Note: 21 peaked at number one on the ARIA Albums Chart on 2 May 2011. It stayed at its peak position for twenty three weeks.)
2.	Christmas	Michael Bublé	1	4 (Note: Christmas peaked at number one on the ARIA Albums Chart on 5 December 2011. It stayed at its peak position for four weeks.)
3.	Doo-Wops & Hooligans	Bruno Mars	2	
4.	Making Mirrors	Gotye	1	1 (Note: Making Mirrors debuted at number one on the ARIA Albums Chart on 29 August 2011. It stayed at its peak position for one week.)
5.	Sorry for Party Rocking	LMFAO	2	
6.	Born This Way	Lady Gaga	1	2 (Note: Born This Way debuted at number one on the ARIA Albums Chart on 30 May 2011. It stayed at its peak position for two consecutive weeks.)
7.	Someone to Watch Over Me	Susan Boyle	1	2 (Note: Someone To Watch Over Me debuted at number one on the ARIA Albums Chart on 14 November 2011. It stayed at its peak position for two consecutive weeks)
8.	Wasting Light	Foo Fighters	1	2 (Note: Wasting Light debuted at number one on the ARIA Albums Chart on 18 April 2011. It stayed at its peak position for two consecutive weeks)
9.	Duets II	Tony Bennett	2	
10.	Mylo Xyloto	Coldplay	1	1 (Note: Mylo Xyloto debuted at number one on the ARIA Albums Chart on 31 October 2011. It stayed at its peak position for one week.)
11.	19	Adele	3	
12.	Greatest Hits... So Far!!!	Pink	1	11 (Note: Greatest Hits... So Far!!! debuted at number one on the ARIA Albums Chart on 21 November 2010. It stayed at its peak position for ten consecutive weeks.)
13.	Loud	Rihanna	2	
14.	Nothing But the Beat	David Guetta	2	
15.	Reece Mastin	Reece Mastin	2	
16.	Ceremonials	Florence and the Machine	1	1 (Note: Ceremonials debuted at number one on the ARIA Albums Chart on 7 November 2011. It stayed at its peak position for one week.)
17	The Best of Cold Chisel - All For You	Cold Chisel	2	
18	Teenage Dream	Katy Perry	1	2 (Note: Teenage Dream debuted at number one on the ARIA Albums Chart on 5 September 2010, and stayed at its peak position for two consecutive weeks.)
19	Here and Now	Nickelback	1	1 (Note: Here and Now debuted at number one on the ARIA Albums Chart on 28 November 2011. It stayed at its peak position for one week.)
20	Greatest Hits	Bon Jovi	1	1 (Note: Greatest Hits debuted at number one on the ARIA Albums Chart on 15 November 2010. It stayed at its peak position for one week.)
21	Roy	Damien Leith	2	
22	My Worlds	Justin Bieber	1	2 (Note: My Worlds debuted at number one on the ARIA Albums Chart on 3 May 2010. It stayed at its peak position for two weeks.)
23	Moonfire	Boy & Bear	2	
24	Triple J's Like a Version 7	Like a Version	5	
25	Who You Are	Jessie J	4	

Peak chart positions from 2011 are from the ARIA Charts, overall position on the End of Year Chart is calculated by the ARIA, based on the number of weeks and position that the records reach within the Top 100 albums chart for each week during 2011.
