= Tim Hart (disambiguation) =

Tim Hart (1948–2009) was an English singer and multi-instrumentalist for British folk band Steeleye Span.

Tim Hart may also refer to:

- Tim Hart (Australian musician), drummer and backing vocalist for folk rock band Boy & Bear
- Tim Hart (drummer), drummer for Theory of a Deadman from 1999 to 2004
