= Southern Sun =

Southern Sun may refer to:

- "Southern Sun/Ready Steady Go", a 2002 single by Paul Oakenfold
- "Southern Sun" (Boy & Bear song), a 2013 single by Boy & Bear
- Southern Sun Hotel Group, is a South African hotel group
