= Boy & Bear (album) =

Studio album by Boy & Bear
- Released: 26 May 2023
- Recorded: 2022–23
- Studios: Golden Retriever Studios, Sydney, Australia
- Length: 47:53
- Label: Community
- Producers: Boy & Bear

Boy & Bear chronology
Suck on Light (2019)	Boy & Bear (2023)	Tripping Over Time (2025)

Singles from Boy & Bear
- 1. "State of Flight" Released: 8 April 2022; 2. "Just to Be Kind" Released: 23 September 2022; 3. "Apex" Released: 3 March 2023; 4. "Silver Moon" Released: 28 April 2023; 5. "Strange World" Released: 19 May 2023

Professional ratings
Review scores
Source	Rating
XS Noize	4.5/5 stars

Boy & Bear is the fifth studio album by Australian indie band Boy & Bear. The release was announced in March 2023 and was released on 26 May 2023 by Community Music.

Upon announcement, Dave Symes from the band said, "We wanted to make an album of seductive grooves, soaring melodies, modulated ambient textures, and great stories. We worked hard to strike the right balance between vintage and cutting edge, polished and sure, but full of heart and wild touches. Experimenting with analogue and digital became a happy place on this record, not just in the way we created sounds but also in the way we wrote them, performed them and put them together."

== Reception ==
Charlotte Lovrin from Under the Radar said "The Sydney collective incorporate subtle, electronic elements into mellow folk / pop compositions, occasionally allowing glimpses into a free spirited rock energy, whilst keeping line with the emotional lyricism of vocalist Dave Hosking."

== Track listing ==
All tracks are written by Boy & Bear.

1. "Strange World" – 3:58
2. "State of Flight" – 3:44
3. "Silver Moon" – 3:29
4. "Magnus" – 3:56
5. "Apex" – 4:19
6. "Muscle" – 4:50
7. "Crossfire" – 5:12
8. "Just to Be Kind" – 3:42
9. "Tin Man" – 3:53
10. "Hostage" – 4:35
11. "The Wheel" – 6:15

== Personnel ==
Credits adapted from the album's liner notes and Tidal.

=== Boy & Bear ===
- David Hosking – vocals, production
- Jonathan Hart – keyboard, production
- Timothy Hart – drums, production
- Killian Gavin – guitar, production
- David Symes – bass, production

=== Additional contributors ===
- Simon Berckelman – engineering
- Chloe Dadd – engineering assistance
- Ethan Reginato – engineering assistance
- Matthew Ottignon – alto saxophone (tracks 4, 5), baritone saxophone (4)
- Rachel Siu – cello (6, 11)
- Heather Lindsay – cello (6, 11)
- Craig Silvey – mixing (1, 3–6, 8–11)
- Collin Dupuis – mixing (2)
- Tom Elmhirst – mixing (8)
- Dani Bennett Spragg – mixing assistance (1, 3–6, 8–11)
- Mario Frias – mixing assistance (1, 3–6, 8–11)
- Adam Hong – mixing assistance (8)
- Greg Calbi – mastering (1, 3–6, 8–11)
- Steve Fallone – mastering (1, 3–6, 8–11)
- Pete Lyman – digital mastering (2)
- Randy Merrill – digital mastering (8)
- Maclay Heriot – photography
- Listen to the Graphics – artwork, design

== Charts ==
Chart performance for Boy & Bear
Chart (2023)	Peak position
Australian Albums (ARIA)	4
