= Tripping Over Time =

Studio album by Boy & Bear
- Released: 12 December 2025
- Studios: Stella Sound (Los Angeles); The Baker's Dozen (Sydney)
- Length: 38:45
- Labels: Boy & Bear
- Producers: Boy & Bear; Justin Stanley

Boy & Bear chronology
Boy & Bear (2023)	Tripping Over Time (2025)

Singles from Tripping Over Time
- 1. "Where Does Life Begin" / "Vertigo" Released: 29 August 2025; 2. "Tripping Over Time" Released: 17 October 2025; 3. "Roses" / "Lost Control" Released: 15 November 2025

Singles from Tripping Over Time (Deluxe)
- 1. "Coming Up for Air" Released: 21 August 2026

Tripping Over Time is the sixth studio album by Australian indie band Boy & Bear. It was announced on 17 October 2025 and released on 12 December 2025 via the group's self-titled label.

Upon announcement, vocalist and guitarist Dave Hosking said: "The record predominantly is about how time changes us. We grow up, our priorities shift, our lives move onto new chapters and with this comes new insights but also new challenges. It's a balancing act of reflecting or even yearning for our youth whilst also embracing life as it inevitably moves forward. So, I think the record's emotional core is really about finding peace in who we are and who we've become. It’s about self-growth.”

The album will be promoted with a performance on the steps of the Sydney Opera House on 14 December 2025.

== Reception ==
Al Newstead from Double J said "this record offers gentle twists on their tried-and-true sound, not a re-haul. And a welcome one at that."

Paul Cashmere from Noise11 said "Tripping Over Time finds Boy & Bear balancing nostalgia with forward motion, an approach that suits a band now more comfortable with its identity. The album's themes of time, change and domestic life are familiar, yet they are expressed with renewed subtlety and melodic assurance. For long-term fans, the record extends the band's signature strengths, and for new listeners, it offers an accessible entry point."

== Track listing ==
All tracks are written by Boy & Bear.

1. "Tripping Over Time" – 4:33
2. "Where Does Life Begin" – 2:57
3. "Vertigo" – 3:22
4. "Ancestors" – 2:56
5. "Thunder" – 3:03
6. "Lost Control" – 3:31
7. "Love Has Been Too Good to Me" – 4:04
8. "Roses" – 2:50
9. "Sleep Talking" – 3:18
10. "All These Years" – 3:48
11. "Movie" – 4:23

Deluxe

1. "Coming Up for Air"
2. "Star Sign"
3. "Alchemy"

== Personnel ==
Credits adapted from the album's liner notes and Tidal.

=== Boy & Bear ===
- David Hosking – vocals, guitar, production
- Killian Gavin – guitar, production
- Timothy Hart – drums, vocals, production
- David Symes – bass, production
- Jonathan Hart – piano, synthesizer, production

=== Additional contributors ===
- Justin Stanley – production, recording, mixing
- Joe Carra – mastering
- Casey Moore – photography
- Grey Ghost – artwork, creative direction

== Charts ==
Chart performance for Tripping Over Time
Chart (2025)	Peak position
Australian Albums (ARIA)	13
