= Tim Hart (Australian musician) =

Australian drummer and singer-songwriter

Tim Hart (born 1984) is a Sydney-based singer-songwriter, better known for his role as drummer and backing vocalist of Australian indie folk-rock band Boy & Bear.

As a member of Boy & Bear, Hart had three top-ten albums in Australia: Moonfire (August 2011), Harlequin Dream (August 2013) and Limit of Love (October 2015), and five ARIA-award wins. Hart lists Simon & Garfunkel, Bob Dylan, Neil Young, Crosby, Stills and Nash, and current folk artists Fionn Regan and Sam Amidon as musical inspirations.

Through international travel with Boy & Bear, Hart explored his solo songwriting capabilities and crafted an album's worth of material that champions his skills as a lyricist and musician. While recording Moonfire (2011) in Nashville, Tennessee, and facing difficulties and hindrances in this recording experience, Hart made a conscious decision to make an album void of the pressures of conflict in the studio and focus on enjoyment and collaboration. "I was convinced that making records should be fun. I loved recording growing up: that's what I was looking for – and for someone I could produce it with... be collaborative with, experimental".

Through collaborations with multi-instrumentalist and producer Mark Myers, Hart brought the song ideas from tour into fruition. Recorded over two weeks in September 2011, Hart's debut album Milling in the Wind was crafted in the comfort of Myers' home studio in Cairns. The album, described as folk-inspired finery, features a number of familiar guests including Boy & Bear frontman Dave Hosking, ex-Boy & Bear bandmate Jake Tarasenko, the Middle East's Jordan Ireland, and New Zealand singer-songwriter Luke Thompson. The instrumentation of the album encompasses folk staples such as the banjo, flute and harmonica, and the innovative use of a tuned-down piano featured on the tracks "So Come the Rain" and "Wicked Winters".

== Discography ==
- Milling in the Wind (2012)
- The Narrow Corner (2018)
- Winning Hand (2021)
