= List of number-one digital tracks of 2011 (Australia) =

ARIA Charts number-one digital tracks of 2011 < 2010 2012 >

Other Australian number-one charts of 2011
- albums
- singles
- urban singles
- dance singles
- club tracks

Top Australian singles and albums of 2011
- Triple J Hottest 100
- top 25 singles
- top 25 albums

The ARIA Digital Track Chart is a chart that ranks the best-performing digital tracks singles of Australia. It is published by Australian Recording Industry Association (ARIA), an organisation who collect music data for the weekly ARIA Charts. To be eligible to appear on the chart, the recording must be a single not an EP and only paid downloads counted from downloadable outlets.

== Chart history ==
Key
†	Indicates number-one digital single of 2011

Issue date	Song	Artist(s)	Reference
3 January	"Grenade"	Bruno Mars	
10 January	"Who's That Girl"	Guy Sebastian featuring Eve	
17 January	"Dirty Talk"	Wynter Gordon	
24 January	"Dirty Talk"	Wynter Gordon	
31 January	"Dirty Talk"	Wynter Gordon	
7 February	"S&M"	Rihanna	
14 February	"S&M"	Rihanna	
21 February	"Born This Way"	Lady Gaga	
28 February	"S&M"	Rihanna	
7 March	"S&M"	Rihanna	
14 March	"S&M"	Rihanna	
21 March	"On the Floor"	Jennifer Lopez featuring Pitbull	
28 March	"On the Floor"	Jennifer Lopez featuring Pitbull	
4 April	"On the Floor"	Jennifer Lopez featuring Pitbull	
11 April	"Sweat"	Snoop Dogg vs. David Guetta	
18 April	"Party Rock Anthem"†	LMFAO featuring Lauren Bennett and GoonRock	
25 April	"Party Rock Anthem"†	LMFAO featuring Lauren Bennett and GoonRock	
2 May	"Party Rock Anthem"†	LMFAO featuring Lauren Bennett and GoonRock	
9 May	"Party Rock Anthem"†	LMFAO featuring Lauren Bennett and GoonRock	
16 May	"Party Rock Anthem"†	LMFAO featuring Lauren Bennett and GoonRock	
23 May	"Party Rock Anthem"†	LMFAO featuring Lauren Bennett and GoonRock	
30 May	"Party Rock Anthem"†	LMFAO featuring Lauren Bennett and GoonRock	
6 June	"Party Rock Anthem"†	LMFAO featuring Lauren Bennett and GoonRock	
13 June	"Party Rock Anthem"†	LMFAO featuring Lauren Bennett and GoonRock	
20 June	"Party Rock Anthem"†	LMFAO featuring Lauren Bennett and GoonRock	
27 June	"Someone Like You"	Adele	
4 July	"Someone Like You"	Adele	
11 July	"Someone Like You"	Adele	
18 July	"Someone Like You"	Adele	
25 July	"Someone Like You"	Adele	
1 August	"Someone Like You"	Adele	
8 August	"Moves Like Jagger"	Maroon 5 featuring Christina Aguilera	
15 August	"Somebody That I Used to Know"	Gotye featuring Kimbra	
22 August	"Somebody That I Used to Know"	Gotye featuring Kimbra	
29 August	"Somebody That I Used to Know"	Gotye featuring Kimbra	
5 September	"Somebody That I Used to Know"	Gotye featuring Kimbra	
12 September	"Somebody That I Used to Know"	Gotye featuring Kimbra	
19 September	"Somebody That I Used to Know"	Gotye featuring Kimbra	
26 September	"Somebody That I Used to Know"	Gotye featuring Kimbra	
3 October	"Somebody That I Used to Know"	Gotye featuring Kimbra	
10 October	"Mr. Know It All"	Kelly Clarkson	
17 October	"Sexy and I Know It"	LMFAO	
24 October	"Sexy and I Know It"	LMFAO	
31 October	"Sexy and I Know It"	LMFAO	
7 November	"Sexy and I Know It"	LMFAO	
14 November	"Sexy and I Know It"	LMFAO	
21 November	"The A Team"	Ed Sheeran	
28 November	"Good Night"	Reece Mastin	
5 December	"Good Night"	Reece Mastin	
12 December	"Sexy and I Know It"	LMFAO	
19 December	"Good Night"	Reece Mastin	
26 December	"Good Night"	Reece Mastin	

== Number-one artists ==
Position	Artist	Weeks at No. 1
1	LMFAO	16
2	Gotye	8
2	Kimbra (as featuring)	8
3	Adele	6
4	Rihanna	5
5	Reece Mastin	4
6	Jennifer Lopez	3
6	Pitbull (as featuring)	3
6	Wynter Gordon	3
7	Bruno Mars	1
7	Ed Sheeran	1
7	Eve (as featuring)	1
7	Guy Sebastian	1
7	Lady Gaga	1
7	Maroon 5	1
7	Christina Aguilera (as featuring)	1
7	David Guetta	1
7	Kelly Clarkson	1
7	Snoop Dogg	1

== See also ==
- 2011 in music
