= Suck on Light =

Studio album by Boy & Bear
- Released: 27 September 2019
- Recorded: 2018–2019
- Studio: Southern Ground, Nashville
- Length: 46:52
- Label: Universal (Island Records Australia)
- Producer: Collin Dupuis, Boy & Bear

Boy & Bear chronology
Limit of Love (2015)	Suck on Light (2019)	Boy & Bear (2023)

Singles from Suck on Light
- 1. "Hold Your Nerve" Released: 31 May 2019; 2. "Suck on Light" Released: 29 August 2019; 3. "Telescope" Released: 13 December 2019

Suck on Light is the fourth studio album of the Australian indie band Boy & Bear. It was released on 27 September 2019 and peaked at number 7 on the Australian ARIA Albums Chart, becoming the band's fourth top ten album.

The album was produced and mixed by the band and Collin Dupuis, and partly mixed by British mixing engineer Tom Elmhirst.

== Track listing ==
- All songs written by Boy & Bear.
1. "Work of Art" – 4:02
2. "Suck on Light" – 4:39
3. "Bird of Paradise" – 3:57
4. "Telescope" – 3:23
5. "Dry Eyes" – 2:36
6. "Long Long Way" – 4:45
7. "Off My Head" – 3:47
8. "Bad People" – 3:22
9. "Hold Your Nerve" – 3:35
10. "Rocking Horse" – 3:39
11. "BCS" – 3:14
12. "Vesuvius" – 6:01

== Charts ==
Chart (2019)	Peak position
Australian Albums (ARIA)	7
