= Aynur Aydın =

Turkish German singer and songwriter

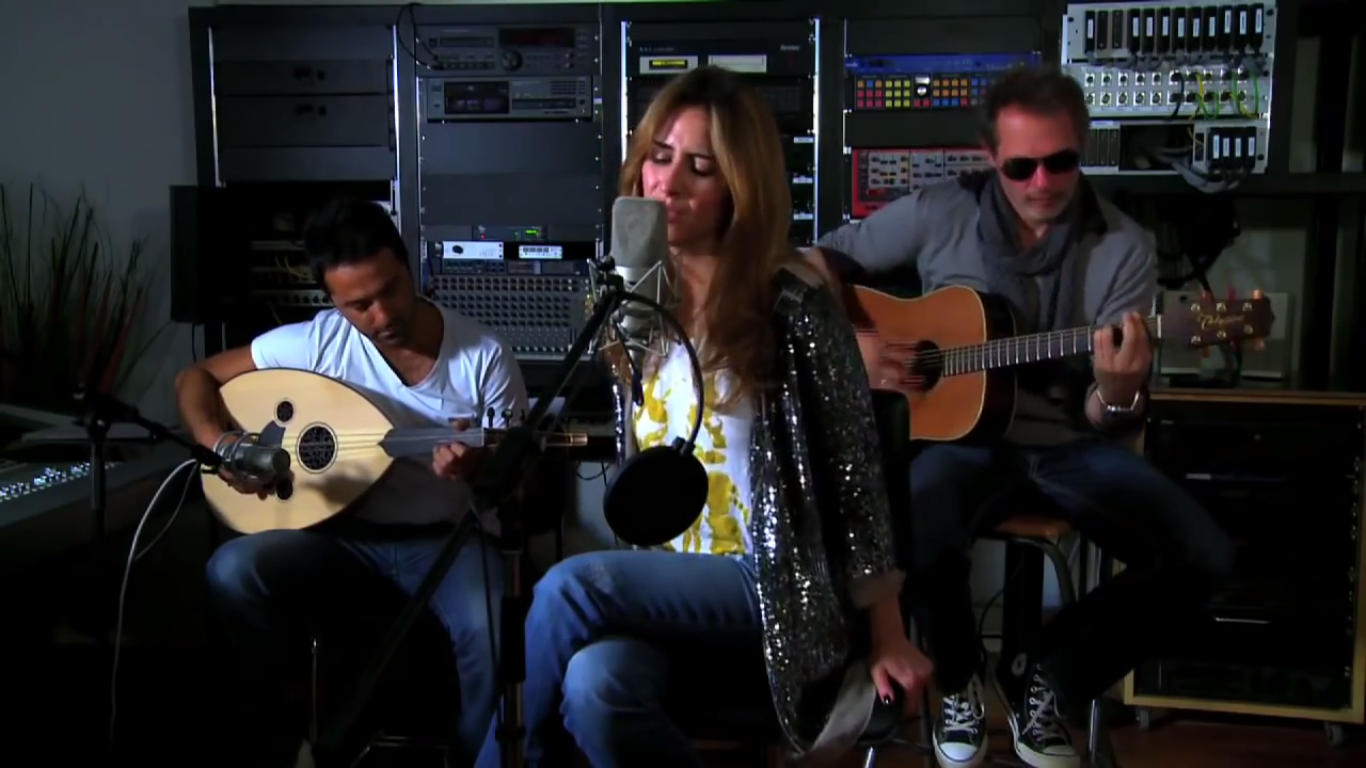
- Aydın performing in a studio (2011)

Background information
- Born: 15 December 1985 (age 40); Munich, West Germany
- Origin: Istanbul, Turkey
- Genres: Pop; dance
- Occupation: Singer-songwriter
- Years active: 2011–present
- Label: Seyhan
- Website: aynurofficial.com

Aynur Aydın (born 15 December 1985) is a Turkish German singer and songwriter. After having some musical experiences in "Sürpriz" band in Germany, she moved to Turkey and released her debut album, 12 Çeşit La La - 12 Ways to La La. She won a Golden Butterfly Award for "Best New Artist" category. In 2016, she released her second album Emanet Beden featuring the hits "Günah Sevap" and "Bi Dakika".

== Life ==
Aynur Aydın was born in Munich, south Germany, to Turkish parents, on 15 December 1985. She started singing at the age of 10 and gained her first experiences in the child and youth theatres. In order to improve her singing skills, she started to make stage shows at the age of 18. In 2000, she joined a band named Sürpriz and they recorded their first album in Istanbul. After Sürpriz disbanded, Aydın joined the group Tagtraeumer. They attempted to represent Germany at the Eurovision Song Contest 2003 with their song "Mükemmel Dünya İçin".

Her first album was recorded in the Cosmos Studio. The songs were combined in the album 12 Çeşit La La - 12 Ways to La La. The Turkish lyrics were written by Aşkın Tuna, Fettah Can, Günay Çoban, Süleyman Yüksel, Nihan Özen and by her own. The first music video was shot for the "Yenildim Daima" and "DNA" which is the English version of the same song. The second music video was shot for the song "Measure Up" and its Turkish version "Yanı Başıma". Then, she took part in Erdem Kınay's Project and sang the song "İşporta". In July 2012, the music video was shot in Belgium and directed by Şenol Korkmaz. In April 2016, her second studio album Emanet Beden was released and the songs "Günah Sevap" and "Bi Dakika" rose to number 3 on Turkish music charts. In December 2017, she released the single "Bana Aşk Ver", featuring Turaç Berkay Özer. Since 2017, she has continued her career by releasing the singles "Salla" (2018), "Düşüne Düşüne" (2019) and "Gel Güzelim" (2019).

== Discography ==
=== Albums ===
- 12 Çeşit La La - 12 Ways to La La (2011)
- Emanet Beden (2016)

=== EPs ===
- Acoustics (2021)

=== Singles ===
- "Life Goes On" (2013)
- "Günah Sevap" (2015)
- "Bi Dakika" (2016)
- "Bana Aşk Ver" (2017)
- "Salla" (2018)
- "Düşüne Düşüne" (2019)
- "Gel Güzelim" (2019)
- "Yağdır" (feat. Damla Yıldız) (2020)
- "Sahiden" (feat. Bünyas Herek) (2020)
- "Sor Gel" (2021)
- "Bilmece" (2022)
- "Siyah" (feat. Turaç Berkay) (2022)
- "Öldürdüm Bizi" (2023)

=== Music videos ===
- "Yenildim Daima" / "DNA" (2011)
- "Yanı Başıma" / "Measure Up" (2012)
- "İşporta" (featuring Erdem Kınay) (2012)
- "Ayrılıklar Mevsimi" / "Better" (2012)
- "Nolur Gitme" / "Stay" (2013)
- "Life Goes On" (2013)
- "Günah Sevap" (2015)
- "Bi Dakika" (2016)
- "Damla Damla" (2016)
- "Anlatma Bana" (2017)
- "Bana Aşk Ver" (2017)
- "Salla" (2018)
- "Düşüne Düşüne" (2019)
- "Gel Güzelim" (2019)
- "Yağdır" (featuring Damla Yıldız) (2020)
- "Diğer Yarın" (2020)
- "Sahiden" (featuring Bünyas Herek) (2020)
- "Sor Gel" (2021)
- "Bilmece" (2022)
- "Siyah" (featuring Turaç Berkay) (2022)
- "Öldürdüm Bizi" (2023)

== Awards and nominations ==
Year	Work	Award	Category	Result	Source
2012	Aynur Aydın	Kral TV Video Music Awards	Best New Female Artist	Nominated	
2012	"Yenildim Daima"	Kral TV Video Music Awards	Best Music Video of the Year	Nominated	
2012	12 Çeşit La La La	Magazin Journalists Association	Magazin Journalists Association Special Prize 2011–2012 Best New Female Artist	Won	
2012	12 Çeşit La La La	Politics Magazine	Best New Female Artist	Won	
2013	12 Çeşit La La La	OMÜ Media Awards	Best New Female Artist	Won	
2013	12 Çeşit La La La	Düzce University 1st Media Awards	Best New Female Artist	Won	
2013	"Ayrılıklar Mevsimi"	Turkey Music Awards	Best Music Video of the Year	Nominated	
2013	Aynur Aydın	Golden Butterfly Awards	Best New Artist of the Year	Won	
2015	Aynur Aydın	1st Gossip Time End of the Year Awards	Best Female Artist	Won	
2015	"Günah Sevap"	1st Gossip Time End of the Year Awards	Best Single	Won	
2015	"Günah Sevap"	1st Gossip Time End of the Year Awards	Best Music Video	Won	
2016	"Günah Sevap"	29th International Consumer Safety Summit Awards	Best Single	Won	
2018	Aynur Aydın	Turkey Youth Awards	Best Female Artist	Nominated	
2018	"Salla"	Turkey Youth Awards	Best Song	Nominated	
2019	"Salla"	Bau Radio 3rd Music Onair Awards	Best Music Video	Won	
2019	"Salla"	Bonne Vie Magazine Awards	Best Music Video	Won	
2019	Aynur Aydın	Powertürk Music Awards	Most Powerful Female Singer	Nominated	
2020	Aynur Aydın	Istanbul University Golden 61 Awards	Best Female Artist of the Year	Nominated	
2020	Aynur Aydın	Magazinn.com 3rd Media and Arts Award	Best Female Pop Music Artist	Nominated	
2021	"Sahiden"	Powertürk Music Awards	Most Powerful Music Video	Nominated	
