= List of top 25 singles for 2011 in Australia =

Top 25 singles of 2011 < 2010 2012 >

Other Australian top charts for 2011
- top 25 albums
- Triple J Hottest 100

Australian number-one charts of 2011
- albums
- singles
- urban singles
- dance singles
- club tracks
- digital tracks

The following lists the top 25 singles of 2011 in Australia from the Australian Recording Industry Association (ARIA) end-of-year singles chart.

"Party Rock Anthem" by LMFAO featuring Lauren Bennett and GoonRock was the biggest song of the year, peaking at #1 for 10 weeks.

#	Title	Artist	Highest pos. reached	Weeks at No. 1
1	"Party Rock Anthem"	LMFAO featuring Lauren Bennett and GoonRock	1	10
2	"Somebody That I Used to Know"	Gotye featuring Kimbra	1	8
3	"Moves Like Jagger"	Maroon 5 featuring Christina Aguilera	2	
4	"Someone Like You"	Adele	1	7
5	"Rolling In the Deep"	Adele	3	
6	"Sexy and I Know It"	LMFAO	1	9
7	"Give Me Everything"	Pitbull featuring Ne-Yo, Afrojack and Nayer	2	
8	"Born This Way"	Lady Gaga	1	1
9	"Price Tag"	Jessie J featuring B.o.B	2	
10	"On the Floor"	Jennifer Lopez featuring Pitbull	1	3
11	"S&M"	Rihanna	1	5
12	"We Found Love"	Rihanna featuring Calvin Harris	2	
13	"Sweat"	Snoop Dogg and David Guetta	1	1
14	"The Lazy Song"	Bruno Mars	6	
15	"E.T."	Katy Perry featuring Kanye West	5	
16	"Jar of Hearts"	Christina Perri	2	
17	"Super Bass"	Nicki Minaj	6	
18	"Titanium"	David Guetta featuring Sia	5	
19	"Dirty Talk"	Wynter Gordon	1	3
20	"Good Feeling"	Flo Rida	4	
21	"Grenade"	Bruno Mars	1	4
22	"Just Can't Get Enough"	The Black Eyed Peas	3	
23	"Pumped Up Kicks"	Foster the People	1	1
24	"The A Team"	Ed Sheeran	2	
25	"It Girl"	Jason Derulo	3	
