= List of number-one club tracks of 2011 (Australia) =

ARIA Charts number-one club tracks of 2011 < 2010 2012 >

Other Australian number-one charts of 2011
- albums
- singles
- urban singles
- dance singles
- digital tracks

Top Australian singles and albums of 2011
- Triple J Hottest 100
- top 25 singles
- top 25 albums

This is the list of number-one tracks on the ARIA Club Chart in 2011, compiled by the Australian Recording Industry Association (ARIA) from weekly DJ reports.

Date		Song	Artist(s)	Reference
January	17	"All My Friends"	Tommy Trash featuring Mr Wilson	
January	24	"All My Friends"	Tommy Trash featuring Mr Wilson	
January	31	"All My Friends"	Tommy Trash featuring Mr Wilson	
February	7	"All My Friends"	Tommy Trash featuring Mr Wilson	
February	14	"All My Friends"	Tommy Trash featuring Mr Wilson	
February	21	"All My Friends"	Tommy Trash featuring Mr Wilson	
February	28	"Whine Ya Waistline"	Danny T featuring Oh Snap!	
March	7	"Whine Ya Waistline"	Danny T featuring Oh Snap!	
March	14	"Whine Ya Waistline"	Danny T featuring Oh Snap!	
March	21	"Whine Ya Waistline"	Danny T featuring Oh Snap!	
March	28	"We Run The Nite"	Tonite Only	
April	4	"We Run The Nite"	Tonite Only	
April	11	"We Run The Nite"	Tonite Only	
April	18	"We Run The Nite"	Tonite Only	
April	25	"We Run The Nite"	Tonite Only	
May	2	"We Run The Nite"	Tonite Only	
May	10	"We Run The Nite"	Tonite Only	
May	16	"We Run The Nite"	Tonite Only	
May	23	"We Run The Nite"	Tonite Only	
May	30	"We Run The Nite"	Tonite Only	
June	6	"Ready 2 Go"	Martin Solveig featuring Kele	
June	13	"Ready 2 Go"	Martin Solveig featuring Kele	
June	20	"Ready 2 Go"	Martin Solveig featuring Kele	
June	27	"Ready 2 Go"	Martin Solveig featuring Kele	
July	4	"Ready 2 Go"	Martin Solveig featuring Kele	
July	11	"Ready 2 Go"	Martin Solveig featuring Kele	
July	18	"Ready 2 Go"	Martin Solveig featuring Kele	
July	25	"Ready 2 Go"	Martin Solveig featuring Kele	
August	1	"Bounce"	Calvin Harris featuring Kelis	
August	8	"Bounce"	Calvin Harris featuring Kelis	
August	15	"Bounce"	Calvin Harris featuring Kelis	
August	22	"Bounce"	Calvin Harris featuring Kelis	
August	29	"Bounce"	Calvin Harris featuring Kelis	
September	5	"Bounce"	Calvin Harris featuring Kelis	
September	12	"Bounce"	Calvin Harris featuring Kelis	
September	19	"You Take Me Higher"	Rogerseventytwo	
September	26	"You Take Me Higher"	Rogerseventytwo	
October	3	"You Take Me Higher"	Rogerseventytwo	
October	10	"You Take Me Higher"	Rogerseventytwo	
October	17	"You Take Me Higher"	Rogerseventytwo	
October	24	"Levels"	Avicii	
October	31	"Levels"	Avicii	
November	7	"Levels"	Avicii	
November	14	"Levels"	Avicii	
November	21	"Levels"	Avicii	
November	28	"Levels"	Avicii	
December	5	"Paradise (Fedde Le Grand mix)"	Coldplay	
December	12	"Levels"	Avicii	
December	19	"Paradise (Fedde Le Grand mix)"	Coldplay	
December	26	"Paradise (Fedde Le Grand mix)"	Coldplay	

== Number-one artists ==
Position	Artist	Weeks at No. 1
1	Tonite Only	10
2	Martin Solveig	8
3	Avicii	7
3	Calvin Harris	7
4	Tommy Trash	6
5	Rogerseventytwo	5
6	Danny T	4
7	Coldplay	3

== See also ==
- ARIA Charts
- List of number-one singles of 2011 (Australia)
- List of number-one albums of 2011 (Australia)
- 2011 in music
