= List of number-one singles of 2011 (Australia) =

ARIA Charts number-one singles of 2011 < 2010 2012 >

Other Australian number-one charts of 2011
- albums
- urban singles
- dance singles
- club tracks
- digital tracks

Top Australian singles and albums of 2011
- Triple J Hottest 100
- top 25 singles
- top 25 albums

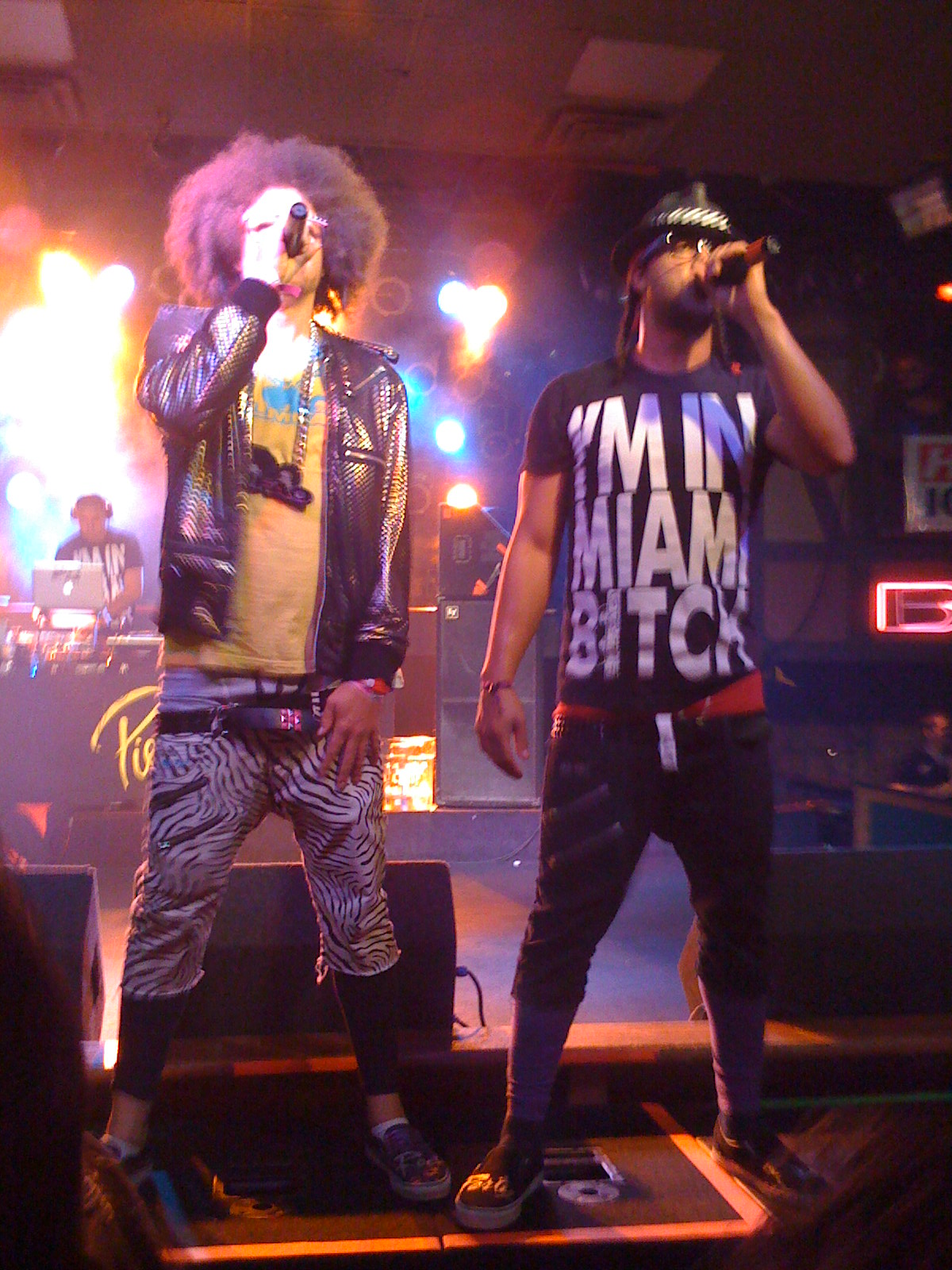
LMFAO's "Party Rock Anthem" topped the ARIA Singles Chart for ten consecutive weeks, becoming the longest running number-one single of the 2010s in the chart's history.

The ARIA Singles Chart ranks the best-performing singles in Australia. Its data, published by the Australian Recording Industry Association, is based collectively on each single's weekly physical and digital sales. In 2011, thirteen singles claimed the top spot, including Bruno Mars' "Grenade" and Guy Sebastian's "Who's That Girl", both of which started their peak positions in late 2010. Ten acts achieved their first number-one single in Australia, either as a lead or featured artist: Wynter Gordon, Pitbull, LMFAO, Lauren Bennett, GoonRock, Adele, Gotye, Kimbra, Kelly Clarkson and Reece Mastin. Five collaborations topped the chart.

LMFAO earned two number-one singles during the year for "Party Rock Anthem" and "Sexy and I Know It". The former was the longest running number-one single of 2011, having topped the ARIA Singles Chart for ten consecutive weeks. It became the longest running number-one single of the 2010s in the chart's history. Adele's "Someone Like You" topped the chart for seven consecutive weeks, while Gotye's "Somebody That I Used to Know" stayed at number one for eight consecutive weeks. It became the first Australian single to achieve this feat since Savage Garden's "Truly Madly Deeply" (1997). LMFAO's "Sexy and I Know It" topped the chart for seven weeks in 2011 and two additional weeks in 2012.

== Chart history ==
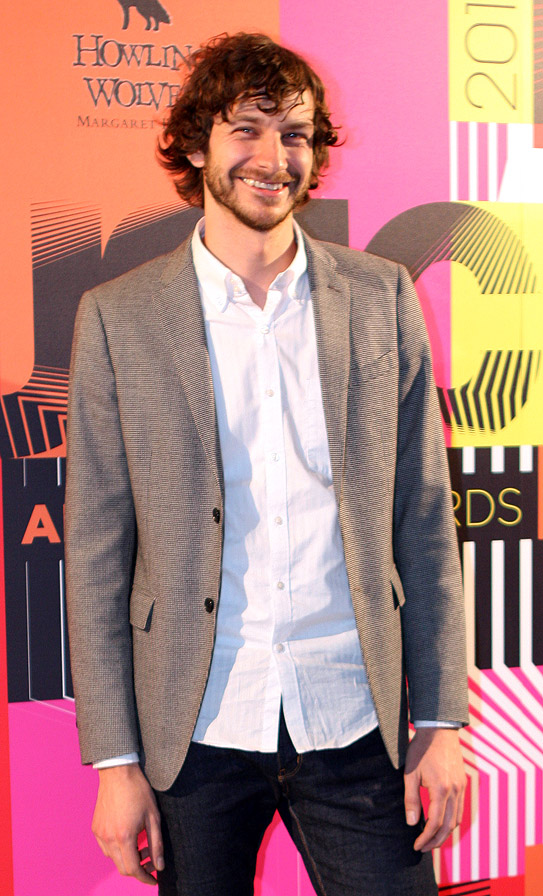
Gotye's "Somebody That I Used to Know" stayed at number one for eight consecutive weeks, becoming the first Australian single to achieve this feat since Savage Garden's "Truly Madly Deeply" (1997).

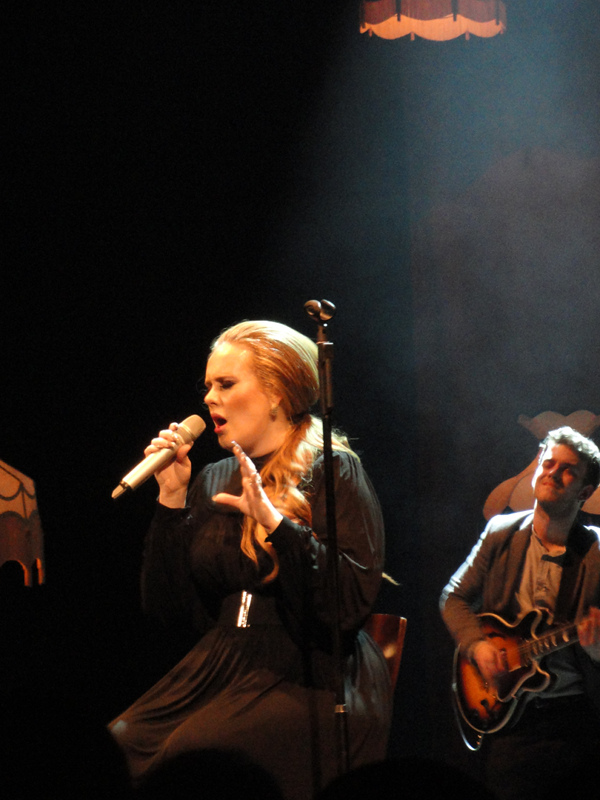
Adele's "Someone Like You" topped the ARIA Singles Chart for seven consecutive weeks, becoming her first number-one single on the chart.

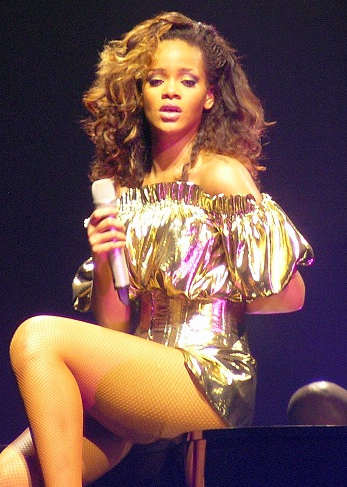
Rihanna's "S&M" topped the ARIA Singles Chart for five weeks, becoming her seventh number-one single on the chart.

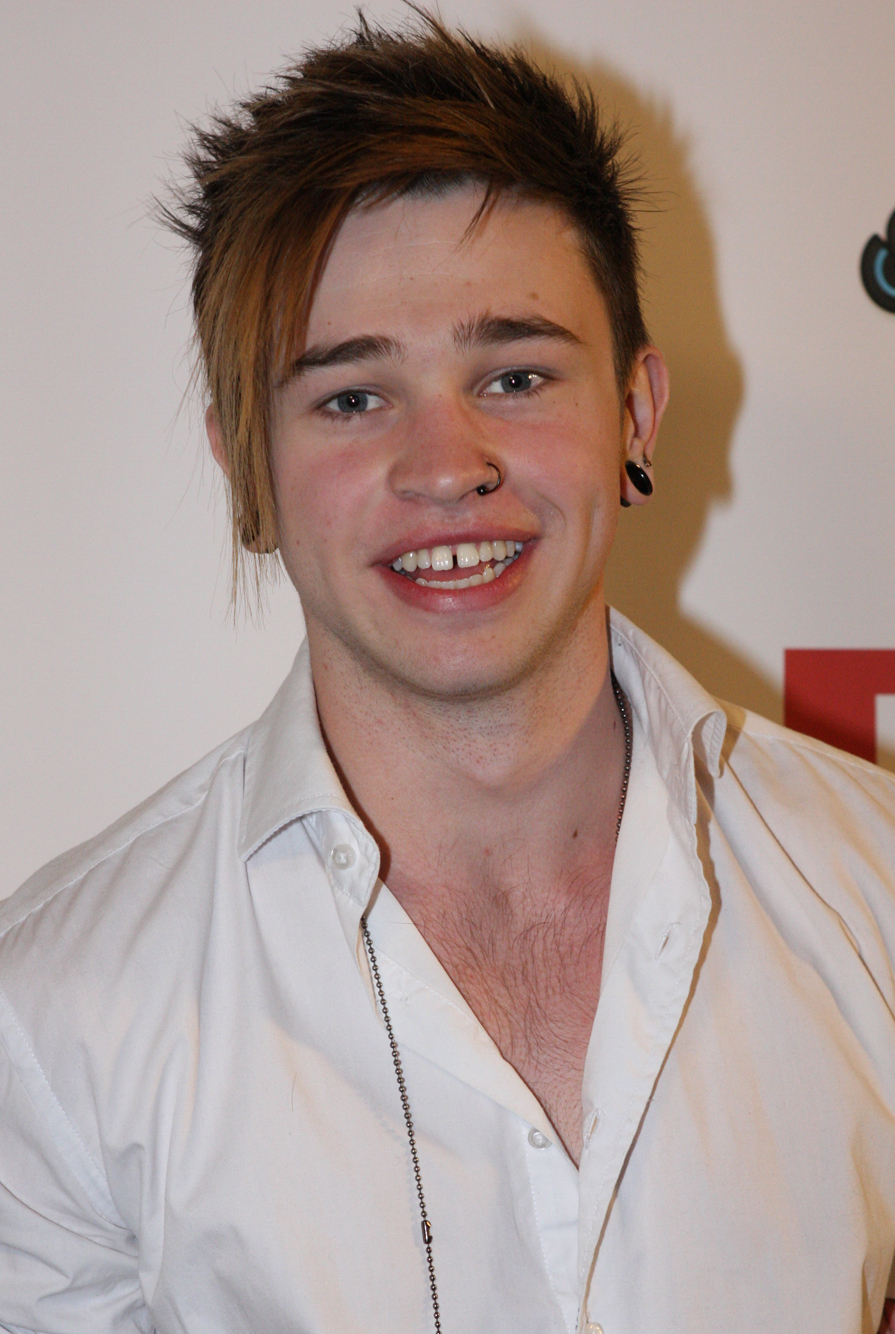
Reece Mastin's "Good Night" topped the ARIA Singles Chart for four weeks, becoming his first number-one single on the chart.

Key
The yellow background indicates the #1 song on ARIA's End of Year Singles Chart of 2011.

| Date | Song | Artist(s) | Ref. |
|---|---|---|---|
| 3 January | "Grenade" | Bruno Mars | |
| 10 January | "Who's That Girl" | Guy Sebastian featuring Eve | |
| 17 January | "Dirty Talk" | Wynter Gordon | |
| 24 January | "Dirty Talk" | Wynter Gordon | |
| 31 January | "Dirty Talk" | Wynter Gordon | |
| 7 February | "S&M" | Rihanna | |
| 14 February | "S&M" | Rihanna | |
| 21 February | "Born This Way" | Lady Gaga | |
| 28 February | "S&M" | Rihanna | |
| 7 March | "S&M" | Rihanna | |
| 14 March | "S&M" | Rihanna | |
| 21 March | "On the Floor" | Jennifer Lopez featuring Pitbull | |
| 28 March | "On the Floor" | Jennifer Lopez featuring Pitbull | |
| 4 April | "On the Floor" | Jennifer Lopez featuring Pitbull | |
| 11 April | "Sweat" | Snoop Dogg vs. David Guetta | |
| 18 April | "Party Rock Anthem" | LMFAO featuring Lauren Bennett and GoonRock | |
| 25 April | "Party Rock Anthem" | LMFAO featuring Lauren Bennett and GoonRock | |
| 2 May | "Party Rock Anthem" | LMFAO featuring Lauren Bennett and GoonRock | |
| 10 May | "Party Rock Anthem" | LMFAO featuring Lauren Bennett and GoonRock | |
| 16 May | "Party Rock Anthem" | LMFAO featuring Lauren Bennett and GoonRock | |
| 23 May | "Party Rock Anthem" | LMFAO featuring Lauren Bennett and GoonRock | |
| 30 May | "Party Rock Anthem" | LMFAO featuring Lauren Bennett and GoonRock | |
| 6 June | "Party Rock Anthem" | LMFAO featuring Lauren Bennett and GoonRock | |
| 13 June | "Party Rock Anthem" | LMFAO featuring Lauren Bennett and GoonRock | |
| 20 June | "Party Rock Anthem" | LMFAO featuring Lauren Bennett and GoonRock | |
| 27 June | "Someone Like You" | Adele | |
| 4 July | "Someone Like You" | Adele | |
| 11 July | "Someone Like You" | Adele | |
| 18 July | "Someone Like You" | Adele | |
| 25 July | "Someone Like You" | Adele | |
| 1 August | "Someone Like You" | Adele | |
| 8 August | "Someone Like You" | Adele | |
| 15 August | "Somebody That I Used to Know" | Gotye featuring Kimbra | |
| 22 August | "Somebody That I Used to Know" | Gotye featuring Kimbra | |
| 29 August | "Somebody That I Used to Know" | Gotye featuring Kimbra | |
| 5 September | "Somebody That I Used to Know" | Gotye featuring Kimbra | |
| 12 September | "Somebody That I Used to Know" | Gotye featuring Kimbra | |
| 19 September | "Somebody That I Used to Know" | Gotye featuring Kimbra | |
| 26 September | "Somebody That I Used to Know" | Gotye featuring Kimbra | |
| 3 October | "Somebody That I Used to Know" | Gotye featuring Kimbra | |
| 10 October | "Mr. Know It All" | Kelly Clarkson | |
| 17 October | "Sexy and I Know It" | LMFAO | |
| 24 October | "Sexy and I Know It" | LMFAO | |
| 31 October | "Sexy and I Know It" | LMFAO | |
| 7 November | "Sexy and I Know It" | LMFAO | |
| 14 November | "Sexy and I Know It" | LMFAO | |
| 21 November | "Sexy and I Know It" | LMFAO | |
| 28 November | "Good Night" | Reece Mastin | |
| 5 December | "Good Night" | Reece Mastin | |
| 12 December | "Sexy and I Know It" | LMFAO | |
| 19 December | "Good Night" | Reece Mastin | |
| 26 December | "Good Night" | Reece Mastin | |

== Number-one artists ==
| Position | Artist | Weeks at No. 1 |
|---|---|---|
| 1 | LMFAO | 17 |
| 2 | Lauren Bennett (as featuring) | 10 |
| 2 | GoonRock (as featuring) | 10 |
| 3 | Gotye | 8 |
| 3 | Kimbra (as featuring) | 8 |
| 4 | Adele | 7 |
| 5 | Rihanna | 5 |
| 6 | Reece Mastin | 4 |
| 7 | Wynter Gordon | 3 |
| 7 | Jennifer Lopez | 3 |
| 7 | Pitbull (as featuring) | 3 |
| 8 | Guy Sebastian | 1 |
| 8 | Eve (as featuring) | 1 |
| 8 | Bruno Mars | 1 |
| 8 | Lady Gaga | 1 |
| 8 | Snoop Dogg | 1 |
| 8 | David Guetta (as featuring) | 1 |
| 8 | Kelly Clarkson | 1 |

== See also ==
- 2011 in music
- List of number-one albums of 2011 (Australia)
- List of top 25 singles for 2011 in Australia
- List of top 10 singles in 2011 (Australia)
