= Emanet Beden =

Studio album by Aynur Aydın
- Released: 28 April 2016
- Genre: Pop; R&B
- Length: 45:44
- Language: Turkish
- Label: Seyhan Müzik

Aynur Aydın chronology
12 Çeşit La La - 12 Ways to La La (2011)	Emanet Beden (2016)

Singles from Emanet Beden
- 1. "Günah Sevap" Released: 28 June 2015; 2. "Bi' Dakika" Released: 29 February 2016; 3. "Damla Damla" Released: 28 October 2016; 4. "Anlatma Bana" Released: 6 March 2017; 5. "Diğer Yarın" Released: 14 August 2020

Emanet Beden (Entrusted Body) is the second studio album by Turkish singer Aynur Aydın. It was released on 28 April 2016 by Seyhan Müzik.

== Marketing and content ==
Five years after the release of her first album 12 Çeşit La La - 12 Ways to La La in 2011, Aydın released her second studio album Emanet Beden in 2016. The album consists of 12 songs, written by Murat Güneş, Günay Çoban, Zeki Güner, Habil Ceyhan and Moh Denebi.

Aydın, explained the preparation process of the album as follows: "We named the new album “Emanet Beden”. It's a more calm and emotional album. It includes about 10 songs. We made the music of 3 songs together with Moh Denebi. I renewed my sound effects [for this album]. I am very excited. I want to share it with you as soon as possible. I recorded the album in Stockholm, accompanied by a giant orchestra. Günay Çoban, Zeki Güner, Murat Güneş and Habil Ceyhan wrote the lyrics. This time I didn't write anything because their words were already sufficient. But I have made the music for three of the songs. ‘Bir Dakika’ was my lead single which was viewed over a million times. It's a situation that I'm not used to. I've been so used to being an underdog... until I was number 1 everywhere. Everything changed at once. It's gonna take me a while to get used to it. Earlier, the song "Günah Sevap" received similar reception. In fact, the music video was the only clip that remained the most on the charts. But it satisfies me to hear more of my songs mumbling at other people's mouths."

As to why the album was called Emanet Beden, she said: "When I started to live in Turkey I realized how close death was to everyone. The situation was different in Germany. It's not only the terrorism in Turkey; murders of women, car accidents, etc. you see them all the time. You see how short life is. And there's the mystic side. Everything is temporary, the body is just a trust to man. What we can take seriously even when our body is entrusted to us is that we need to be aware that life is made up of beautiful moments."

== Track listing ==
Emanet Beden
No.	Title	Writer(s)	Composers	Length
1.	"Emanet Beden"	Günay Çoban	Moh Denebi	3:32
2.	"Diğer Yarın"	Murat Güneş	Moh Denebi · Paddy Dalton	3:54
3.	"Bi Dakika"	Murat Güneş	Moh Denebi · Aynur Aydın	3:25
4.	"Çok Tatlı"	Günay Çoban	Moh Denebi	3:14
5.	"Ninni" (feat. Belçim Bilgin)	Murat Güneş	Moh Denebi	3:42
6.	"Geri Dön"	Zeki Güner	Lawrence Needham · Jacob Attwool · Paddy Dalton	3:20
7.	"Damla Damla"	Ahmet Kurtis	Bertan Asllani	3:37
8.	"Anlatma Bana"	Habil Ceyhan	Habil Ceyhan	4:53
9.	"Günah Sevap"	Habil Ceyhan	Murat Güneş	4:39
10.	"Yasak Aşk"	Günay Çoban	Moh Denebi	3:55
11.	"Bi' Dakika" (İskender Paydaş Version)	Murat Güneş	Moh Denebi · Aynur Aydın	3:49
12.	"Anlatma Bana" (Moh Denebi Version)	Habil Ceyhan	Habil Ceyhan	3:44
Total length:				45:44

== Release history ==
Country	Date	Format(s)	Label
Turkey	28 April 2016	CD · Digital download	Seyhan Müzik
Worldwide	28 April 2016	Digital download	Seyhan Müzik
