= With Emperor Antarctica =

EP by Boy & Bear
- Released: 7 May 2010
- Studio: Studios 301
- Label: Chess Club, UMA
- Producer: Rick Will, Andy Mak

Boy & Bear chronology
With Emperor Antarctica (2010)	Moonfire (2011)

Singles from With Emperor Antarctica
- 1. "Mexican Mavis" Released: October 2009; 2. "Rabbit Song" Released: April 2010; 3. "Blood to Gold" Released: September 2010

With Emperor Antarctica is the debut extended play by the Australian indie rock band Boy & Bear.

It was released in May 2010 and peaked at number 63 on the ARIA Charts.

In November 2020, the EP was re-released and on vinyl for the first time. Upon announcement the group said "Ten years on from its original release, the EP that launched our career With Emperor Antarctica is being released on vinyl. It features one of our favourites and one of our earliest songs ever added to Triple J, 'The Rabbit Song'".

== Track listing ==
- All tracks written by Boy & Bear.
1. "Blood to Gold" - 2:17
2. "Rabbit Song" - 2:57
3. "Mexican Mavis" - 3:06
4. "The Storm" - 3:56
5. "The Rain" - 3:35

== Charts ==
=== Weekly charts ===
Weekly chart performance for With Emperor Antarctica
Chart (2010)	Peak position
Australia (ARIA)	63
Australia Physical Singles (ARIA)	1
