= List of number-one albums of 2011 (Australia) =

ARIA Charts number-one albums of 2011 < 2010 2012 >

Other Australian number-one charts of 2011
- singles
- urban singles
- dance singles
- club tracks
- digital tracks

Top Australian singles and albums of 2011
- Triple J Hottest 100
- top 25 singles
- top 25 albums

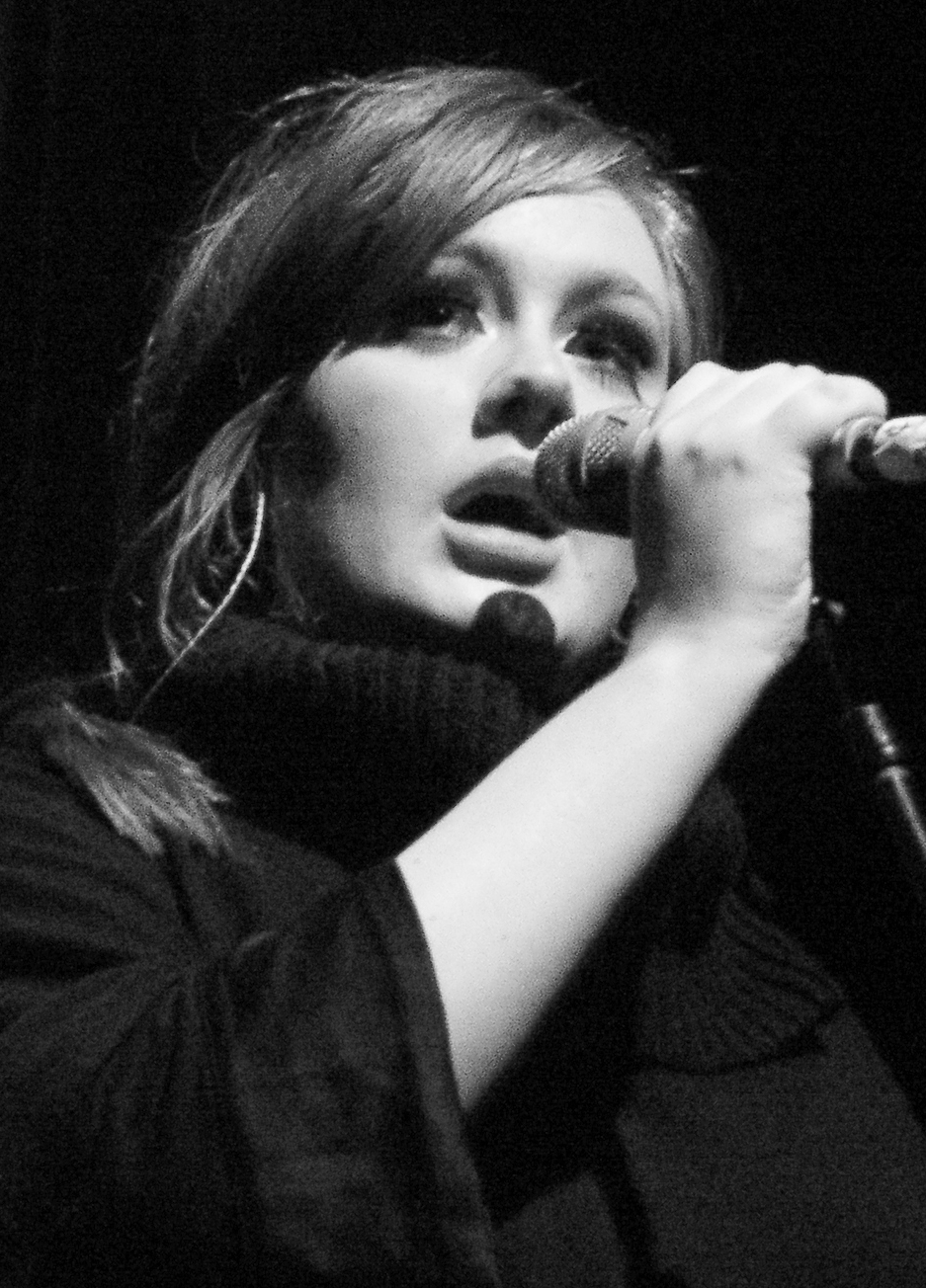
Adele's 21 was the longest-running number-one album, having topped the ARIA Albums Chart for twenty-three weeks in 2011 and an additional nine weeks in 2012.

The ARIA Albums Chart ranks the best-performing albums and extended plays in Australia. Its data, published by the Australian Recording Industry Association, is based collectively on each album and EP's weekly physical and digital sales. In 2011, sixteen albums claimed the top spot, including Pink's Greatest Hits... So Far!!!, which started its peak position in late 2010. Seven acts achieved their first number-one album in Australia: The Strokes, Britney Spears, Drapht, Adele, Gotye, Florence and the Machine, and Nickelback.

Michael Bublé earned two number-one albums during the year for Crazy Love and Christmas. Adele's 21 was the longest-running number-one album, having topped the ARIA Albums Chart for twenty-three weeks in 2011 and an additional nine weeks in 2012.

== Chart history ==
Key
The yellow background indicates the #1 album on ARIA's End of Year Albums Chart of 2011.

Date	Album	Artist(s)	Ref.
3 January	Greatest Hits... So Far!!!	Pink	
10 January	Greatest Hits... So Far!!!	Pink	
17 January	Greatest Hits... So Far!!!	Pink	
24 January	Greatest Hits... So Far!!!	Pink	
31 January	Greatest Hits... So Far!!!	Pink	
6 February	Greatest Hits... So Far!!!	Pink	
13 February	Greatest Hits... So Far!!!	Pink	
21 February	Crazy Love	Michael Bublé	
28 February	Crazy Love	Michael Bublé	
7 March	Crazy Love	Michael Bublé	
14 March	Goodbye Lullaby	Avril Lavigne	
21 March	Glee: The Music, Volume 5	Glee Cast	
28 March	Angles	The Strokes	
4 April	Femme Fatale	Britney Spears	
11 April	The Life of Riley	Drapht	
18 April	Wasting Light	Foo Fighters	
25 April	Wasting Light	Foo Fighters	
2 May	21	Adele	
9 May	21	Adele	
16 May	21	Adele	
23 May	21	Adele	
30 May	Born This Way	Lady Gaga	
6 June	Born This Way	Lady Gaga	
13 June	21	Adele	
20 June	21	Adele	
27 June	21	Adele	
4 July	21	Adele	
11 July	21	Adele	
18 July	21	Adele	
25 July	21	Adele	
1 August	21	Adele	
8 August	21	Adele	
15 August	21	Adele	
22 August	21	Adele	
29 August	Making Mirrors	Gotye	
5 September	21	Adele	
12 September	21	Adele	
19 September	21	Adele	
26 September	21	Adele	
3 October	21	Adele	
10 October	21	Adele	
17 October	21	Adele	
24 October	21	Adele	
31 October	Mylo Xyloto	Coldplay	
7 November	Ceremonials	Florence and the Machine	
14 November	Someone to Watch Over Me	Susan Boyle	
21 November	Someone to Watch Over Me	Susan Boyle	
28 November	Here and Now	Nickelback	
5 December	Christmas	Michael Bublé	
12 December	Christmas	Michael Bublé	
19 December	Christmas	Michael Bublé	
26 December	Christmas	Michael Bublé	

== Number-one artists ==
Position	Artist	Weeks at No. 1
1	Adele	23
2	Michael Bublé	7
2	Pink	7
3	Foo Fighters	2
3	Lady Gaga	2
3	Susan Boyle	2
4	Avril Lavigne	1
4	Glee Cast	1
4	The Strokes	1
4	Britney Spears	1
4	Drapht	1
4	Gotye	1
4	Coldplay	1
4	Florence and the Machine	1
4	Nickelback	1

== See also ==
- 2011 in music
- List of number-one singles of 2011 (Australia)
