= List of number-one urban singles of 2011 (Australia) =

ARIA Charts number-one urban singles of 2011 < 2010 2012 >

Other Australian number-one charts of 2011
- albums
- singles
- dance singles
- club tracks
- digital tracks

Top Australian singles and albums of 2011
- Triple J Hottest 100
- top 25 singles
- top 25 albums

The ARIA Urban Chart is a chart that ranks the best-performing Urban tracks singles of Australia. It is published by Australian Recording Industry Association (ARIA), an organisation who collect music data for the weekly ARIA Charts. To be eligible to appear on the chart, the recording must be a single, and be "predominantly of a Urban nature."

== Chart history ==
Issue date	Song	Artist(s)	Reference
3 January	"Who's That Girl"	Guy Sebastian featuring Eve	
10 January	"Who's That Girl"	Guy Sebastian featuring Eve	
17 January	"Who's That Girl"	Guy Sebastian featuring Eve	
24 January	"Who's That Girl"	Guy Sebastian featuring Eve	
31 January	"S&M"	Rihanna	
7 February	"S&M"	Rihanna	
14 February	"S&M"	Rihanna	
21 February	"S&M"	Rihanna	
28 February	"S&M"	Rihanna	
7 March	"S&M"	Rihanna	
14 March	"S&M"	Rihanna	
21 March	"S&M"	Rihanna	
28 March	"Price Tag"	Jessie J featuring B.o.B	
4 April	"Price Tag"	Jessie J featuring B.o.B	
11 April	"Price Tag"	Jessie J featuring B.o.B	
18 April	"Party Rock Anthem"	LMFAO featuring Lauren Bennett & GoonRock	
25 April	"Party Rock Anthem"	LMFAO featuring Lauren Bennett & GoonRock	
2 May	"Party Rock Anthem"	LMFAO featuring Lauren Bennett & GoonRock	
9 May	"Party Rock Anthem"	LMFAO featuring Lauren Bennett & GoonRock	
16 May	"Party Rock Anthem"	LMFAO featuring Lauren Bennett & GoonRock	
23 May	"Party Rock Anthem"	LMFAO featuring Lauren Bennett & GoonRock	
30 May	"Party Rock Anthem"	LMFAO featuring Lauren Bennett & GoonRock	
6 June	"Party Rock Anthem"	LMFAO featuring Lauren Bennett & GoonRock	
13 June	"Party Rock Anthem"	LMFAO featuring Lauren Bennett & GoonRock	
20 June	"Party Rock Anthem"	LMFAO featuring Lauren Bennett & GoonRock	
27 June	"Party Rock Anthem"	LMFAO featuring Lauren Bennett & GoonRock	
4 July	"Party Rock Anthem"	LMFAO featuring Lauren Bennett & GoonRock	
11 July	"Party Rock Anthem"	LMFAO featuring Lauren Bennett & GoonRock	
18 July	"Party Rock Anthem"	LMFAO featuring Lauren Bennett & GoonRock	
25 July	"Party Rock Anthem"	LMFAO featuring Lauren Bennett & GoonRock	
1 August	"Party Rock Anthem"	LMFAO featuring Lauren Bennett & GoonRock	
8 August	"Party Rock Anthem"	LMFAO featuring Lauren Bennett & GoonRock	
15 August	"Inescapable"	Jessica Mauboy	
22 August	"Inescapable"	Jessica Mauboy	
29 August	"It Girl"	Jason Derulo	
5 September	"It Girl"	Jason Derulo	
12 September	"It Girl"	Jason Derulo	
19 September	"It Girl"	Jason Derulo	
26 September	"It Girl"	Jason Derulo	
3 October	"It Girl"	Jason Derulo	
10 October	"It Girl"	Jason Derulo	
17 October	"Good Feeling"	Flo Rida	
24 October	"Good Feeling"	Flo Rida	
31 October	"Good Feeling"	Flo Rida	
7 November	"We Found Love"	Rihanna featuring Calvin Harris	
14 November	"We Found Love"	Rihanna featuring Calvin Harris	
21 November	"We Found Love"	Rihanna featuring Calvin Harris	
28 November	"We Found Love"	Rihanna featuring Calvin Harris	
5 December	"Dedication to My Ex (Miss That)"	Lloyd featuring André 3000 & Lil Wayne	
12 December	"Dedication to My Ex (Miss That)"	Lloyd featuring André 3000 & Lil Wayne	
19 December	"Dedication to My Ex (Miss That)"	Lloyd featuring André 3000 & Lil Wayne	
26 December	"Dedication to My Ex (Miss That)"	Lloyd featuring André 3000 & Lil Wayne	

== Number-one artists ==
Position	Artist	Weeks at No. 1
1	LMFAO	17
1	GoonRock	17
1	Lauren Bennett	17
2	Rihanna	12
3	Jason Derulo	7
4	Guy Sebastian	4
4	Eve	4
4	André 3000	4
4	Lloyd	4
4	Lil Wayne	4
5	Flo Rida	3
5	Jessie J	3
5	B.o.B	3
6	Jessica Mauboy	2

== See also ==
- 2011 in music
- List of number-one singles of 2011 (Australia)
