= List of number-one dance singles of 2011 (Australia) =

ARIA Charts number-one dance singles of 2011 < 2010 2012 >

Other Australian number-one charts of 2011
- albums
- singles
- urban singles
- club tracks
- digital tracks

Top Australian singles and albums of 2011
- Triple J Hottest 100
- top 25 singles
- top 25 albums

The ARIA Dance Chart is a chart that ranks the best-performing dance singles of Australia. It is published by Australian Recording Industry Association (ARIA), an organisation who collect music data for the weekly ARIA Charts. To be eligible to appear on the chart, the recording must be a single, and be "predominantly of a dance nature, or with a featured track of a dance nature, or included in the ARIA Club Chart or a comparable overseas chart".

== Chart history ==
Issue date	Song	Artist(s)	Reference
3 January	"Who's That Chick?"	David Guetta featuring Rihanna	
10 January	"Dirty Talk"	Wynter Gordon	
17 January	"Dirty Talk"	Wynter Gordon	
24 January	"Dirty Talk"	Wynter Gordon	
31 January	"Dirty Talk"	Wynter Gordon	
7 February	"Dirty Talk"	Wynter Gordon	
14 February	"Dirty Talk"	Wynter Gordon	
21 February	"Born This Way"	Lady Gaga	
7 March	"Born This Way"	Lady Gaga	
14 March	"Born This Way"	Lady Gaga	
21 March	"Born This Way"	Lady Gaga	
28 March	"Sweat"	Snoop Dogg vs. David Guetta	
4 April	"Sweat"	Snoop Dogg vs. David Guetta	
11 April	"Sweat"	Snoop Dogg vs. David Guetta	
18 April	"Sweat"	Snoop Dogg vs. David Guetta	
25 April	"Sweat"	Snoop Dogg vs. David Guetta	
2 May	"Sweat"	Snoop Dogg vs. David Guetta	
9 May	"Sweat"	Snoop Dogg vs. David Guetta	
16 May	"Sweat"	Snoop Dogg vs. David Guetta	
23 May	"Sweat"	Snoop Dogg vs. David Guetta	
30 May	"We Run the Night"	Havana Brown	
6 June	"We Run the Night"	Havana Brown	
13 June	"We Run the Night"	Havana Brown	
20 June	"We Run the Night"	Havana Brown	
27 June	"We Run the Night"	Havana Brown	
4 July	"We Run the Night"	Havana Brown	
11 July	"We Run the Night"	Havana Brown	
18 July	"The Edge of Glory"	Lady Gaga	
25 July	"The Edge of Glory"	Lady Gaga	
1 August	"Somebody That I Used to Know"	Gotye featuring Kimbra	
8 August	"Somebody That I Used to Know"	Gotye featuring Kimbra	
15 August	"Somebody That I Used to Know"	Gotye featuring Kimbra	
22 August	"Somebody That I Used to Know"	Gotye featuring Kimbra	
29 August	"Bounce"	Calvin Harris	
5 September	"Titanium"	David Guetta featuring Sia	
12 September	"Titanium"	David Guetta featuring Sia	
19 September	"You Make Me Feel..."	Cobra Starship featuring Sabi	
26 September	"You Make Me Feel..."	Cobra Starship featuring Sabi	
3 October	"Titanium"	David Guetta featuring Sia	
10 October	"Sexy and I Know It"	LMFAO	
17 October	"Sexy and I Know It"	LMFAO	
24 October	"Sexy and I Know It"	LMFAO	
31 October	"Sexy and I Know It"	LMFAO	
7 November	"Sexy and I Know It"	LMFAO	
14 November	"Sexy and I Know It"	LMFAO	
21 November	"Sexy and I Know It"	LMFAO	
28 November	"Sexy and I Know It"	LMFAO	
5 December	"Sexy and I Know It"	LMFAO	
12 December	"Sexy and I Know It"	LMFAO	
19 December	"Sexy and I Know It"	LMFAO	
26 December	"Sexy and I Know It"	LMFAO	

== Number-one artists ==
Position	Artist	Weeks at No. 1
1	David Guetta	13
2	LMFAO	12
3	Snoop Dogg	9
4	Havana Brown	7
5	Wynter Gordon	6
6	Gotye	4
6	Kimbra (as featuring)	4
6	Lady Gaga	4
7	Sia (as featuring)	3
8	Cobra Starship	2
8	Sabi (as featuring)	2
9	Calvin Harris	1
9	Rihanna (as featuring)	1

== See also ==
- 2011 in music
- List of number-one singles of 2011 (Australia)
- List of number-one club tracks of 2011 (Australia)
