= Harlequin Dream =

Studio album by Boy & Bear
- Released: 16 August 2013 (Australia); 29 October 2013 (US)
- Recorded: October 2012–2013; Alberts Studio (Neutral Bay, Sydney, Australia)
- Genres: Indie rock, indie folk, Indie pop
- Length: 47:40
- Label: Universal (Island Records Australia)
- Producer: Wayne Connolly

Boy & Bear chronology
Moonfire (2011)	Harlequin Dream (2013)	Limit of Love (2015)

Singles from Harlequin Dream
- 1. "Southern Sun" Released: 3 June 2013; 2. "Three Headed Woman" Released: 7 August 2013; 3. "Harlequin Dream" Released: December 2013; 4. "Bridges" Released: March 2014

Harlequin Dream is the second studio album by the Australian indie rock band Boy & Bear. It was released on 16 August 2013 by Island Records in Australia and reached #1 on the ARIA Albums Chart in its debut week. The lead single is the first track, "Southern Sun"; second single "Three Headed Woman" was released in August just prior to the album.

A collector's edition of the album featuring vinyl and CD copies of the album as well as a lyric booklet, artwork print and "one-of-a-kind Polaroid photo of the band" was also released alongside the standard edition.

Within weeks of finishing work on their debut, the band was bitten by a fresh creative bug. Recording in their home town of Sydney rather than abroad, keeping things local allowed the band to be close to friends and family. As a result, the album reflects the personalities and experiences of the band.

The band embarked on the 16 Days Under a Southern Sun tour in October and November 2013.

At the J Awards of 2013, the album was nominated for Australian Album of the Year.

== Track listing ==
All tracks are written by Boy & Bear.

No.	Title	Length
1.	"Southern Sun"	4:40
2.	"Old Town Blues"	3:23
3.	"Harlequin Dream"	4:20
4.	"Three Headed Woman"	4:02
5.	"Bridges"	4:05
6.	"A Moment's Grace"	4:52
7.	"End of the Line"	3:46
8.	"Back Down the Black"	6:17
9.	"Real Estate"	2:57
10.	"Stranger"	4:57
11.	"Arrow Flight"	4:21
12.	"Walking On A Dream"	4:52
Total length:		52:32

== Charts ==
=== Weekly charts ===
Chart (2013–14)	Peak position
Australian Albums (ARIA)	1
Belgian Albums (Ultratop Flanders)	80

=== Year-end charts ===
Chart (2013)	Position
Australian Albums Chart	57
Australian Artist Albums Chart	14
Chart (2014)	Position
Australian Albums Chart	92

== Certifications ==
Region	Certification	Certified units/sales
Australia (ARIA)	3× Platinum	210,000^{‡}
^{‡} Sales+streaming figures based on certification alone.
