= Southern Sun (Boy & Bear song) =

Single by Boy & Bear

from the album Harlequin Dream
- Released: 3 June 2013
- Length: 4:10 (single version); 4:40 (album version); 3:44 (radio edit)
- Label: Boy & Bear
- Songwriter(s): Boy & Bear
- Producer(s): Wayne Connolly

Boy & Bear singles chronology
"Big Man" (2012)	"Southern Sun" (2013)	"Three Headed Woman" (2013)

Music video
- "Southern Sun" on YouTube

"Southern Sun" is a song recorded by Australian indie rock band Boy & Bear and released in June 2013 as the lead single from their second studio album Harlequin Dream (2013). The song peaked at number 63 on the ARIA Charts.

The song was launched on triple J and the band said the song was inspired by the works of Bruce Springsteen, Fleetwood Mac and Paul Simon.

The band performed the song on Conan in July 2014.

== Charts ==
Chart (2013)	Peak position
Australia (ARIA)	63
France (SNEP)	82

== Certifications ==
Region	Certification	Certified units/sales
Australia (ARIA)	3× Platinum	210,000^{‡}
New Zealand (RMNZ)	Platinum	30,000^{‡}
^{‡} Sales+streaming figures based on certification alone.
