= Limit of Love =

Studio album by Boy & Bear
- Released: 9 October 2015 (Australia, New Zealand, USA / Canada); 30 October 2015 (UK / UE)
- Recorded: Real World Studios, England
- Genres: Indie rock, indie folk
- Length: 39:51
- Label: Universal (Island Records Australia)
- Producer: Ethan Johns

Boy & Bear chronology
Harlequin Dream (2013)	Limit of Love (2015)	Suck on Light (2019)

Singles from Limit of Love
- 1. "Walk the Wire" Released: 7 September 2015; 2. "A Thousand Faces" Released: 2 October 2015; 3. "Limit of Love" Released: January 2016; 4. "Where’d You Go" Released: February 2016

Limit of Love is the third studio album of the Australian indie band Boy & Bear. It was released on 9 October 2015.

== Track listing ==
1. "Limit of Love" - 3:31
2. "Walk the Wire" - 2:59
3. "Where'd You Go" - 3:09
4. "Hollow Ground" - 3:40
5. "Breakdown Slow" - 3:56
6. "Showdown" - 4:22
7. "A Thousand Faces" - 2:53
8. "Man Alone" - 3:17
9. "Ghost 11" - 3:27
10. "Just Dumb" - 5:13
11. "Fox Hole" - 3:25

== Charts ==
Chart (2015–16)	Peak position
Australian Albums (ARIA)	1
New Zealand Albums (RMNZ)	31
Dutch Albums (Album Top 100)	83

== Certifications ==
Region	Certification	Certified units/sales
Australia (ARIA)	Gold	35,000^{‡}
^{‡} Sales+streaming figures based on certification alone.

== See also ==
- List of number-one albums of 2015 (Australia)
