= Feeding Line =

Single by Boy & Bear

from the album Moonfire
- Released: 9 May 2011
- Length: 4:30
- Label: Boy & Bear
- Songwriter(s): Boy & Bear
- Producer(s): Joe Chiccarelli, Boy & Bear

Boy & Bear singles chronology
"Maryanne" (2011)	"Feeding Line" (2011)	"Milk & Sticks" (2011)

Music video
- "Feeding Line" on YouTube

"Feeding Line" is a song recorded by Australian indie rock band Boy & Bear and released in May 2011 as the lead single from their debut studio album Moonfire (2011). The song peaked at number 46 on the ARIA Charts and was certified 2× Platinum in Australian in 2020.

At the ARIA Music Awards of 2011, the song was nominated for two awards, winning Breakthrough Artist - Single. The performed the track at the ceremony.

== Reception ==
Beat Magazine said "'Feeding Line' is a tight, energetic indie rock tune that moves decisively away from seventies folk harmonies towards a more complex, muscular sound." adding "It's a better representation of what makes Boy & Bear such an electrifying live band."

== Charts ==
Chart (2011/12)	Peak position
Australia (ARIA)	46

== Certification ==
Region	Certification	Certified units/sales
Australia (ARIA)	2× Platinum	140,000^{‡}
^{‡} Sales+streaming figures based on certification alone.
