= Boy & Bear =

Australian indie folk band

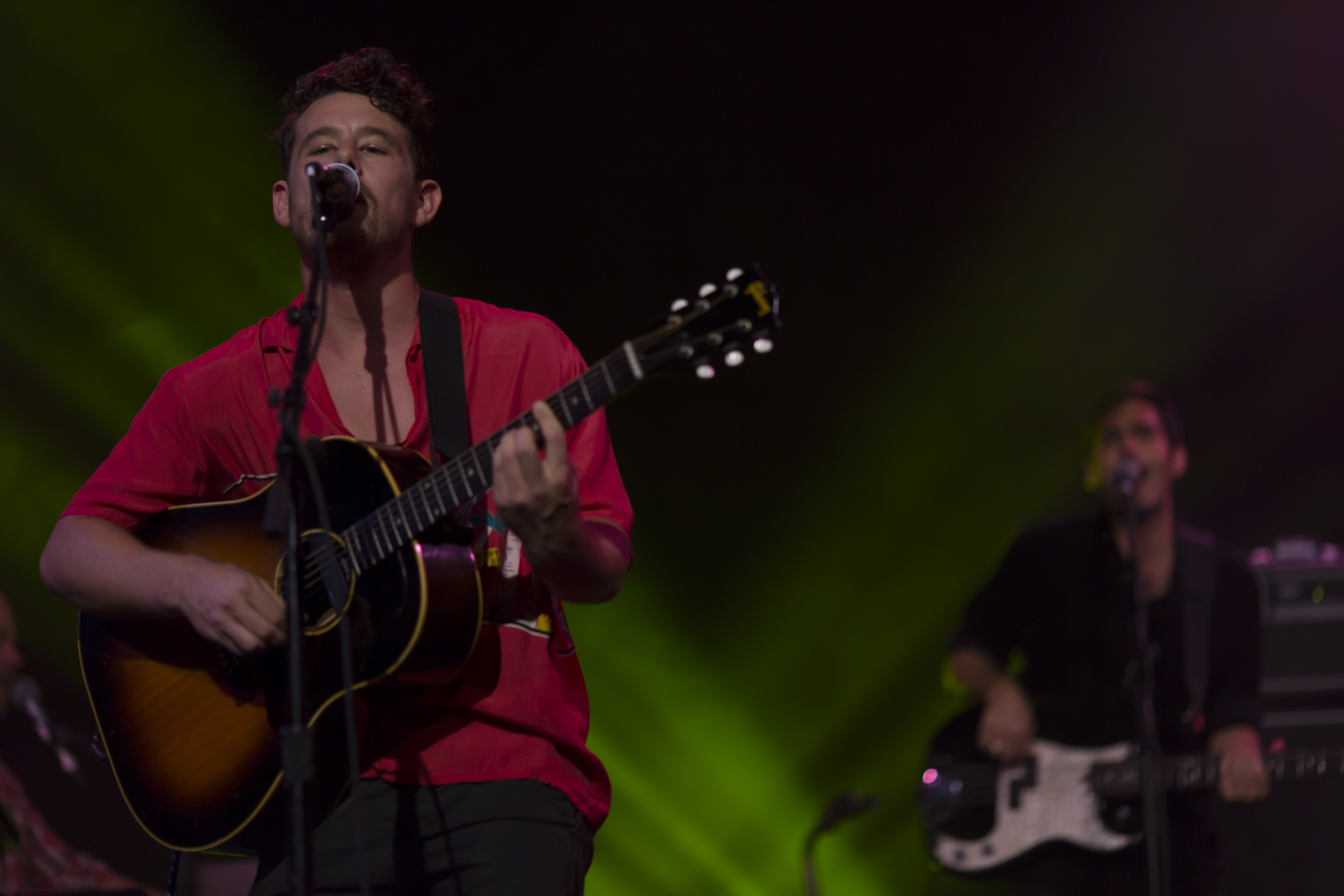
- Boy & Bear at Byron Bay Bluesfest 2015

Background information
- Origin: Sydney, New South Wales, Australia
- Genres: Indie rock; folk rock; indie folk
- Years active: 2009–present
- Labels: Nettwerk; Island
- Members: Dave Hosking; Killian Gavin; Tim Hart; Jon Hart; David Symes
- Past members: Jake Tarasenko
- Website: boyandbear.com

Boy & Bear are an Australian indie folk band formed in 2009, consisting of David Hosking (vocals and guitar), Killian Gavin (vocals and guitar), Tim Hart (drums, vocals, banjo, mandolin), Jonathan Hart (keys, synths, vocals), and David Symes (bass). The band has released two EPs and five studio albums. Moonfire (2011) debuted at #2 on the ARIA Charts, while Harlequin Dream (2013) and Limit of Love (2015) both debuted at #1. On 27 September 2019, they released their long-awaited fourth studio album, Suck on Light. The band released their self-titled fifth studio album on 26 May 2023. The name Boy and Bear comes indirectly from a Randy Newman song, Simon Smith and his Amazing Dancing Bear “Oh, who would think a boy and bear, Could be well accepted everywhere…”

== History ==
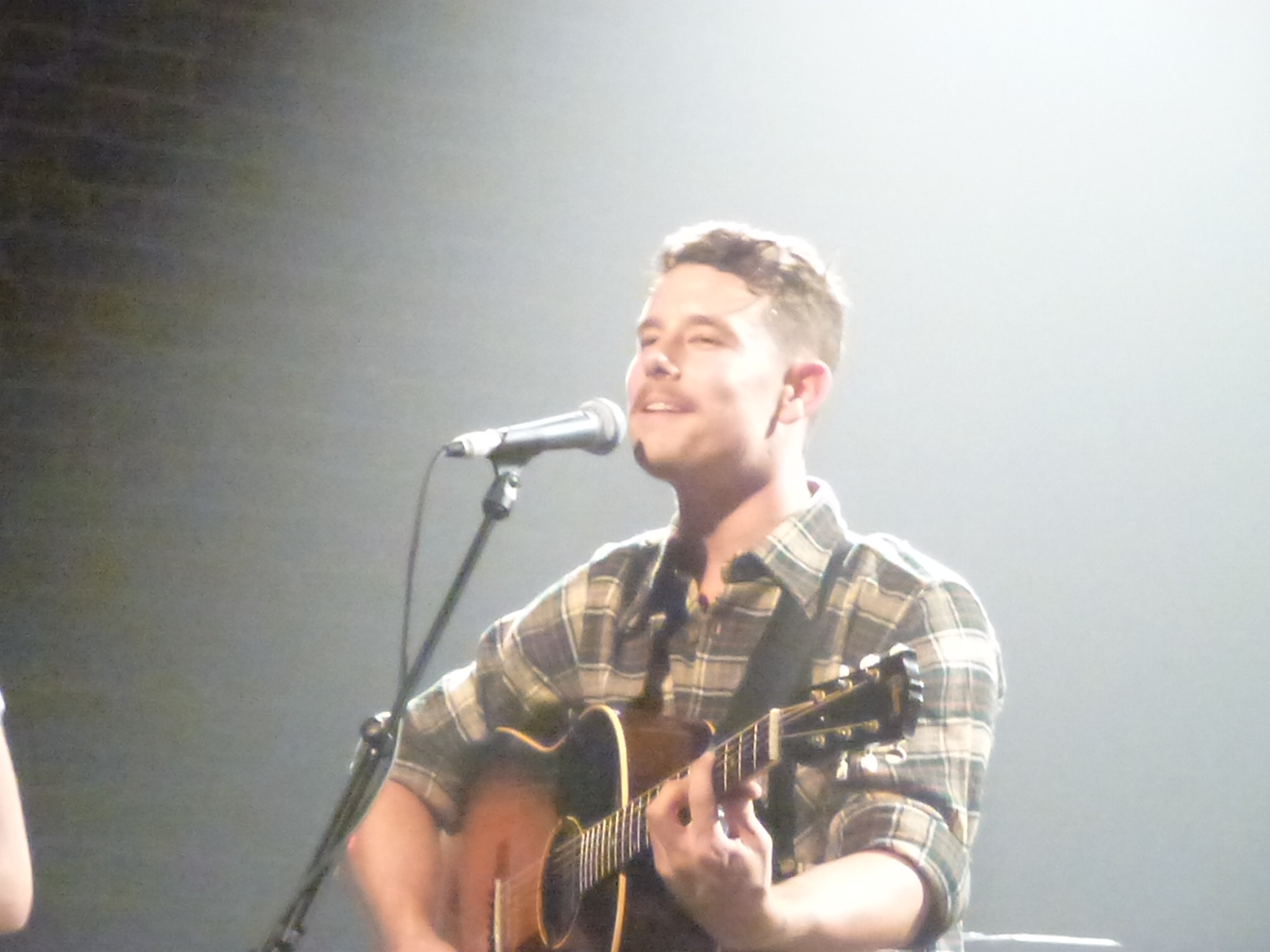
Hosking performing with Boy & Bear at Village Underground, New York City, in 2014

=== 2009–2010: Formation ===
Boy & Bear was formed in 2009 in Sydney, beginning as a solo project for singer-songwriter Dave Hosking. In February 2009, Hosking uploaded a track, "The Storm", to the Unearthed program on radio station Triple J, and it became a featured song at the station. Hosking met Killian Gavin, who was a singer-songwriter and guitarist in Ovell, and the pair started jamming together. Tim Hart, from another university band, Wintersound, joined as a drummer and singer-songwriter. Then they expanded with Hart's brother Jon (ex-Wintersound) on keyboard, vocals, mandolin and banjo and Jake Tarasenko (ex-Tripartisan Approach) on bass guitar. All five had fronted their own groups and became friends after regularly sharing the stage at gigs. Their songwriting usually has Hosking strumming chords on a guitar, Gavin writing the hooks, and the Hart brothers providing backing vocal lyrics, keyboard parts and drum lines. On 21 October, they issued an independent single, "Mexican Mavis", which was a featured song for the "Next Crop '09" segment on Triple J. In November 2009, the band described its style as "a combination of drivey indie folk and choral harmonies".

Aside from Triple J, the band received national airplay on NovaFM. The group signed with Island Records Australia, and in 2013, they signed internationally with Nettwerk.

After winning the 2009 Unearthed competition, they gained a performance spot at Homebake in December. They later toured Australia backing Angus and Julia Stone and Hungry Kids of Hungary.

In 2010, they toured the UK supporting Laura Marling and Alessi's Ark, and later supported Mumford & Sons on their Australian tour. They also featured on Passenger's album 'Flight of the Crow'. In May Boy & Bear released their debut extended play, With Emperor Antarctica, which peaked at No. 63 on the ARIA Singles Chart. In the same year, they recorded the song "Fall at Your Feet" for He Will Have His Way, a tribute album to singer-songwriter brothers Tim and Neil Finn. Boy & Bear's version of "Fall at Your Feet" was listed at No. 5 on the Triple J Hottest 100, 2010. Another of their tracks, "Rabbit Song", was placed at No. 45. In November 2010 their cover of "Fall at Your Feet" peaked at No. 34 on the ARIA Singles Chart.

In April 2011, their early single "Mexican Mavis" was featured on US TV series 90210, season three episode "Nerdy Little Secrets".

=== 2011–2012: Moonfire ===
On 5 August 2011, Boy & Bear released their debut album Moonfire. It was recorded in Nashville, Tennessee with producer, Joe Chiccarelli and reached No. 2 on the ARIA Albums Chart. During that year, single "Feeding Line" debuted at No. 49. In December, Moonfire finished third in the Triple J album poll of 2011. It also reached platinum sales. On the Triple J Hottest 100, 2011 Boy & Bear were listed three times, with "Part Time Believer" and "Milk & Sticks" at No. 50 and No. 49, respectively, while "Feeding Line" reached No. 4. At the ARIA Music Awards of 2011 Boy & Bear won in five categories: Breakthrough Artist – Single for "Feeding Line"; and Album of the Year, Best Group, Breakthrough Artist – Album and Best Adult Alternative Release for Moonfire. The following year, the band received an ARIA nomination for Best Group.

In October 2012, it was announced that the original bass-guitarist Jake Tarasenko had left the band 'to pursue other interests'. He was replaced by David Symes, who had previously worked as a session musician for The Sleepy Jackson, Sarah Blasko and Marcia Hines. The group also announced that they had started work on a follow-up album.

=== 2013–2014: Harlequin Dream ===
Boy & Bear released their second album on 16 August 2013, titled Harlequin Dream. It debuted at #1 on the ARIA charts. Its release was preceded by the lead single "Southern Sun", a song which paid homage to Richard Clapton's relaxed 1970s steel guitar sound. In 2013 Boy & Bear were nominated for three ARIA awards, including Best Group, Best Rock Album and Producer of the Year with Wayne Connolly. The album was also nominated for a J Award and was ranked #7 in Triple J's Top 10 Albums of 2013 poll in the same year. From Harlequin Dream's release until the end of 2014, Boy & Bear completed three international tours, covering AUS/NZ/US/CAN/UK/EU and totalling 168 shows.

Boy & Bear received an ARIA nomination in 2014 for Best Australia Live Act. The album went Platinum in 2016.

=== 2015–2017: Limit of Love ===
From April to May 2015 Boy & Bear teamed up with producer Ethan Johns (Ryan Adams, Kings of Leon, Kaiser Chiefs) at Peter Gabriel's Real World Studio in the UK to record their third album. The album was recorded live and straight to tape, with virtually no overdubs. On 13 August the band announced the album and its lead single "Walk the Wire", which was added to high rotation on Triple J. Limit of Love was released on 9 October 2015 in Australia debuting at #1 on the ARIA charts, New Zealand, North America and Canada and will be available from 30 October in the United Kingdom and Europe. The album was certified Gold in Australia in 2018.

=== 2018–2019: Suck on Light ===
In July 2018 the band began posting pictures of them in a recording studio for their fourth album.

The band's fourth album, Suck on Light, was released on 27 September 2019. Produced by the band and Collin Dupuis at Nashville's Southern Ground Studios, and mixed in part by mixer Tom Elmhirst, the 12-track album includes the singles "Hold Your Nerve", "Work of Art" and "Telescope".

=== 2020: At Golden Retriever Studios ===
In April 2020, Boy & Bear announced the release of their forthcoming acoustic album titled At Golden Retriever Studios, set for release in September 2020. The band said "When we tour the USA we often get asked to perform our songs acoustically when we are on the radio... It gave us the idea to record a selection of acoustic tracks and present them as an album."

=== 2022–2023: Boy & Bear ===
On 8 April 2022, Boy & Bear released "State of Flight", their first single since 2019, and their first released independently. Throughout June and July 2022, the group celebrated the 10-year anniversary celebration of their album Moonfire with an extensive national and regional tour. On 23 September 2022, Boy & Bear released "Just to Be Kind". In March 2023, the group released "Apex" and announced their fifth studio album would be released on 26 May 2023.

In September 2023, Boy & Bear released the three-track EP Lost Dreams. The tracks were recorded during the studio sessions for the band's second studio album Harlequin Dream.

=== 2024–present: Tripping Over Time ===
In October 2025, the group released "Tripping Over Time", the title track from their sixth studio album.

== Band members ==
=== Current members ===
- Dave Hosking – lead vocals, rhythm guitar (2009–present)
- Killian Gavin – lead guitar, mandolin, backing vocals (2009–present)
- Tim Hart – drums, percussion, rhythm guitar, backing vocals (2009–present)
- Jon Hart – keyboards, mandolin, banjo, backing vocals (2011–present)
- David Symes – bass guitar (2012–present)

=== Former members ===
- Jake Tarasenko – bass guitar, percussion, backing vocals (2009–2012)

== Discography ==
- Moonfire (2011)
- Harlequin Dream (2013)
- Limit of Love (2015)
- Suck on Light (2019)
- Boy & Bear (2023)
- Tripping Over Time (2025)

== Awards and nominations ==
=== APRA Awards ===
The APRA Awards are presented annually from 1982 by the Australasian Performing Right Association (APRA), "honouring composers and songwriters". Boy & Bear have been nominated for one award.

Year	Nominee / work	Award	Result
2012	Boy & Bear (Killian Gavin, Jonathon Hart, Timothy Hart, David Hosking, Jacob Tarasenko)	Breakthrough Songwriter of the Year	Won
2012	"Feeding Line" (Killian Gavin, Jonathon Hart, Timothy Hart, David Hosking, Jacob Tarasenko)	Song of the Year	Shortlisted
2014	"Harlequin Dream" (Killian Gavin, Jonathon Hart, Timothy Hart, David Hosking)	Song of the Year	Shortlisted
2014	"Southern Sun" (Killian Gavin, Jonathon Hart, Timothy Hart, David Hosking)	Song of the Year	Shortlisted

=== ARIA Awards ===
The ARIA Music Awards are presented annually from 1987 by the Australian Recording Industry Association (ARIA). In 2011 Boy & Bear won five awards from seven nominations. The group performed their leading single, "Feeding Line", at the awards ceremony. They received further nominations in 2012, 2013, 2014 & 2016.

Year	Nominee / work	Award	Result
2011	"Feeding Line"	Single of the Year	Nominated
2011	"Feeding Line"	Breakthrough Artist – Single	Won
2011	Moonfire	Album of the Year	Won
2011	Moonfire	Best Group	Won
2011	Moonfire	Breakthrough Artist – Album	Won
2011	Moonfire	Best Adult Alternative Album	Won
2011	Moonfire – Joe Chiccarelli	Producer of the Year	Nominated
2012	"Big Man"	Best Group	Nominated
2013	Harlequin Dream	Best Group	Nominated
2013	Harlequin Dream	Best Rock Album	Nominated
2013	Harlequin Dream	Producer of the Year	Nominated
2014	National Tour	Best Australian Live Act	Nominated
2016	Limit of Love	Best Rock Album	Nominated

=== Australian Music Prize ===
The Australian Music Prize (the AMP) is an annual award of $30,000 given to an Australian band or solo artist in recognition of the merit of an album released during the year of award. They commenced in 2005.

Year	Nominee / work	Award	Result
2011	Moonfire	Australian Music Prize	Won

=== J Awards ===
The J Awards are an annual series of Australian music awards that were established by the Australian Broadcasting Corporation's youth-focused radio station Triple J. They commenced in 2005.

Year	Nominee / work	Award	Result
2009	Boy & Bear	Unearthed	Won
2013	Harlequin Dream	Australian Album of the Year	Nominated
2015	"Walk the Wire"	Australian Video of the Year	Nominated

=== National Live Music Awards ===
The National Live Music Awards (NLMAs) are a broad recognition of Australia's diverse live industry, celebrating the success of the Australian live scene. The awards commenced in 2016.

Year	Nominee / work	Award	Result
2016	themselves	International Live Achievement (Group)	Nominated
