= Moonfire (album) =

Studio album by Boy & Bear
- Released: 5 August 2011
- Recorded: Nashville, Tennessee
- Genre: Indie rock, indie folk
- Length: 42:36
- Label: Island Records Australia, Universal Motown Republic
- Producer: Joe Chiccarelli, Boy & Bear

Boy & Bear chronology
With Emperor Antarctica (2010)	Moonfire (2011)	Harlequin Dream (2013)

Singles from Moonfire
- 1. "Feeding Line" Released: 9 May 2011; 2. "Milk & Sticks" Released: 11 July 2011; 3. "Part Time Believer" Released: 19 October 2011; 4. "Big Man" Released: 11 May 2012

Professional ratings
Review scores
Source	Rating
AllMusic	3.5/5 stars
Drowned in Sound	(5/10)
musicOMH	2.5/5 stars
NME	(4/10)
The Fly	3/5 stars
The Independent	3/5 stars

Moonfire is the debut studio album by the Australian indie rock band Boy & Bear. It was released on 5 August 2011 in the band's home country, with later release dates elsewhere. Recorded at Blackbird Studio in Nashville, Tennessee, with producer Joe Chiccarelli, the record garnered comparisons to other indie folk bands such as Fleet Foxes and Mumford & Sons.

== Track listing ==
1. "Lordy May" – 3:33
2. "Feeding Line" – 4:28
3. "Milk & Sticks" – 4:42
4. "Part Time Believer" – 4:12
5. "My Only One" – 5:48
6. "Percy Warner Park" – 1:03
7. "Golden Jubilee" – 3:17
8. "House & Farm" – 3:12
9. "The Village" – 1:35
10. "Beach" – 6:11
11. "Big Man" – 4:24

== Charts ==
=== Weekly charts ===
Chart (2011–12)	Peak position
Australian Albums (ARIA)	2
Dutch Albums (Album Top 100)	91

=== Year-end charts ===
Chart (2011)	Position
Australian Albums Chart	23
Australian Artist Albums Chart	5

Chart (2012)	Position
Australian Albums Chart	45
Australian Artist Albums Chart	17

=== Decade-end charts ===
Chart (2010–2019)	Position
Australian Albums (ARIA)	99
Australian Artist Albums (ARIA)	20

== Certifications ==
Region	Certification	Certified units/sales
Australia (ARIA)	2× Platinum	140,000^{^}
^{^} Shipments figures based on certification alone.
