= Triple J's Hottest 100 of 2011 =

Most popular songs of the year in Australia

2011 Triple J Hottest 100
- Album artwork for the CD compilation

Countdown details
- Date of countdown: 26 January 2012
- Votes cast: 1,378,869

Countdown highlights
- Winning song: Gotye featuring Kimbra "Somebody That I Used to Know"
- Most entries: Kimbra; The Wombats (4 tracks)

Chronology
← Previous; 2011 (Australian Albums)	Next → 2012

The 2011 Triple J Hottest 100 was the nineteenth countdown of the most popular songs of the year, as chosen by the listeners of Australian radio station Triple J. It was announced on Australia Day, 26 January 2012.

Voting commenced on 14 December 2011, and closed on 16 January 2012. A separate poll for the most popular album of the year was held in late November and early December 2011, with Making Mirrors by Gotye being voted the most popular album of the year.

== Full list ==
Note: Australian artists

#	Song	Artist	Country of origin
1	Somebody That I Used to Know	Gotye featuring Kimbra	Australia/New Zealand
2	Lonely Boy	The Black Keys	United States
3	Brother	Matt Corby	Australia
4	Feeding Line	Boy & Bear	Australia
5	Midnight City	M83	France
6	Video Games	Lana Del Rey	United States
7	Awkward	San Cisco	Australia
8	Boys like You	360 featuring Gossling	Australia
9	Endless Summer	The Jezabels	Australia
10	I Love It	Hilltop Hoods featuring Sia	Australia
11	Feel So Close	Calvin Harris	United Kingdom
12	Contact High	Architecture in Helsinki	Australia
13	Shake It Out	Florence & the Machine	United Kingdom
14	Call It What You Want	Foster the People	United States
15	Helena Beat	Foster the People	United States
16	Tongue Tied	Grouplove	United States
17	Even Though I'm a Woman	Seeker Lover Keeper	Australia
18	Jump into the Fog	The Wombats	United Kingdom
19	Promises	Nero	United Kingdom
20	Act Yr Age	Bluejuice	Australia
21	Scary Monsters and Nice Sprites	Skrillex	United States
22	Air	Snakadaktal	Australia
23	Jungle	Emma Louise	Australia
24	1996	The Wombats	United Kingdom
25	Cameo Lover	Kimbra	New Zealand
26	Techno Fan	The Wombats	United Kingdom
27	Changed the Way You Kiss Me	Example	United Kingdom
28	Pumped Up Kicks (Like a Version)	Owl Eyes	Australia
29	Sing It (The Life of Riley)	Drapht	Australia
30	Bounce	Calvin Harris featuring Kelis	United Kingdom/United States
31	It's Nice to Be Alive	Ball Park Music	Australia
32	L.I.F.E.G.O.E.S.O.N.	Noah & the Whale	United Kingdom
33	Otis	Jay Z and Kanye West featuring Otis Redding	United States
34	I Feel Better	Gotye	Australia
35	Cigarettes	Illy	Australia
36	No Light, No Light	Florence & the Machine	United Kingdom
37	Killer	360	Australia
38	All I Want Is You	Ball Park Music	Australia
39	Cinema (Skrillex Remix)	Benny Benassi featuring Gary Go	Italy/United Kingdom/United States
40	Houdini	Foster the People	United States
41	Under Cover of Darkness	The Strokes	United States
42	What the Water Gave Me	Florence & the Machine	United Kingdom
43	Itchin' on a Photograph	Grouplove	United States
44	Speak of the Devil	Hermitude	Australia
45	Junk of the Heart (Happy)	The Kooks	United Kingdom
46	Hanging On	Active Child	United States
47	Mary	Sparkadia	Australia
48	A.I.M. Fire!	Art vs. Science	Australia
49	Milk & Sticks	Boy & Bear	Australia
50	Part Time Believer	Boy & Bear	Australia
51	Money	The Drums	United States
52	Good Intent	Kimbra	New Zealand
53	Holocene	Bon Iver	United States
54	Turn Me On	The Grates	Australia
55	Escapee	Architecture in Helsinki	Australia
56	China	Sparkadia	Australia
57	Lay It Down	The Rubens	Australia
58	I Follow Rivers	Lykke Li	Sweden
59	Holy Moses	Washington	Australia
60	Gabriel	Joe Goddard featuring Valentina	United Kingdom
61	Lotus Flower	Radiohead	United Kingdom
62	Black Water Rising	Stonefield	Australia
63	Rope	Foo Fighters	United States
64	Raiders	Owl Eyes	Australia
65	Re-Wired	Kasabian	United Kingdom
66	Perth	Bon Iver	United States
67	Zimbabwe	New Navy	Australia
68	Don't Sit Down 'Cause I've Moved Your Chair	Arctic Monkeys	United Kingdom
69	Calgary	Bon Iver	United States
70	She's Like a Comet	Jebediah	Australia
71	Arnold	Luke Million	Australia
72	Foreign Language	Flight Facilities featuring Jess Higgs	Australia
73	First of the Year (Equinox)	Skrillex	United States
74	Bali Party	Drapht featuring N'fa	Australia
75	Shot Yourself in the Foot Again	Example and Skream	United Kingdom
76	Dreamshaker	Redcoats	Australia
77	The Look	Metronomy	United Kingdom
78	History's Door	Husky	Australia
79	Wildfire	SBTRKT featuring Little Dragon	United Kingdom/Sweden
80	The Truth	Pnau	Australia
81	Biding My Time	Busby Marou	Australia
82	Ritual Union	Little Dragon	Sweden
83	Future Starts Slow	The Kills	United Kingdom/United States
84	Throw It Away	360 featuring Josh Pyke	Australia
85	Gay Pirates	Cosmo Jarvis	United Kingdom
86	Light All My Lights	Seeker Lover Keeper	Australia
87	In Your Light	Gotye	Australia
88	Shuffle	Bombay Bicycle Club	United Kingdom
89	Santa Fe	Beirut	United States
90	Make Some Noise	Beastie Boys	United States
91	Fragile Bird	City & Colour	Canada
92	The Wilhelm Scream	James Blake	United Kingdom
93	Two Way Street	Kimbra	New Zealand
94	Our Perfect Disease	The Wombats	United Kingdom
95	Naked Kids	Grouplove	United States
96	Machu Picchu	The Strokes	United States
97	Arlandria	Foo Fighters	United States
98	Niggas in Paris	Jay-Z and Kanye West	United States
99	You Should Consider Having Sex with a Bearded Man	The Beards	Australia
100	The Suburbs	Mr Little Jeans	Norway

=== #101–200 List ===
On 8 February 2012, Triple J announced the tracks voted #101 to #200.

#	Song	Artist	Country of origin
101	Land of the Bloody Unknown	The Middle East	Australia
102	Bad to Me	Loon Lake	Australia
103	On the Prowl	Ellesquire	Australia
104	Gladiator	Big Scary	Australia
105	Hawaiian Air	Friendly Fires	United Kingdom
106	Trycolour	The Jezabels	Australia
107	The Grand Optimist	City & Colour	Canada
108	Stay Awake	Example	United Kingdom
109	2 Hearts	Digitalism	Germany
110	Help Is on the Way	Rise Against	United States
111	Golden Jubilee	Boy & Bear	Australia
112	No One Wants a Lover	Josh Pyke	Australia
113	How Deep Is Your Love?	The Rapture	United States
114	Harder, Better, Faster, Stronger (Like a Version)	Art vs. Science	Australia
115	Pharaohs	SBTRKT featuring Roses Gabor	United Kingdom
116	Hold On	SBTRKT featuring Sampha	United Kingdom
117	Days Are Forgotten	Kasabian	United Kingdom
118	Need You Now	Cut Copy	Australia
119	I'm His Girl	Friends	United States
120	I Can Show You	Tim & Jean	Australia
121	Will Do	TV on the Radio	United States
122	Oh Well That's What You Get Falling in Love With a Cowboy	Lanie Lane	Australia
123	The Reckoning	The Getaway Plan	Australia
124	State of the Art	Gotye	Australia
125	Zoom	Last Dinosaurs	Australia
126	The Sum of It All	The Herd	Australia
127	The Ending Is Just the Beginning Repeating	The Living End	Australia
128	Me and You	Nero	United Kingdom
129	Mermaids	Jinja Safari	Australia
130	Crush on You	Nero	United Kingdom
131	Yonkers	Tyler, the Creator	United States
132	Lose It	Austra	Canada
133	How Come You Never Go There	Feist	Canada
134	Sweet Dreams	The Grates	Australia
135	The Devil Takes Care of His Own	Band of Skulls	United Kingdom
136	Days	Joelistics	Australia
137	What Did I Do?	Kele featuring Lucy Taylor	United Kingdom
138	Waste	Foster the People	United States
139	We Run the Nite	Tonite Only	Australia
140	Civilization	Justice	France
141	Everybody Wants to Rule the World (Like a Version)	Andy Bull	Australia
142	If You Wanna	The Vaccines	United Kingdom
143	Mr Polite	The Jungle Giants	Australia
144	Chimera	Snakadaktal	Australia
145	Circles	Digitalism	Germany
146	The Words That Maketh Murder	PJ Harvey	United Kingdom
147	Shake Me Down	Cage the Elephant	United States
148	Bridge Burning	Foo Fighters	United States
149	Golden Revolver	San Cisco	Australia
150	Ray Charles	Chiddy Bang	United States
151	Love Is a Drug	Eskimo Joe	Australia
152	Ain't Hungry	Lanie Lane	Australia/United States
153	Only If for a Night	Florence & the Machine	United Kingdom
154	March into the Ocean	British India	Australia
155	Girls Just Want to Have Fun (Like a Version)	Busby Marou	Australia
156	Make It Stop (September's Children)	Rise Against	United States
157	Start Again	The Aston Shuffle featuring Lovers Electric	Australia
158	Up All Night	Blink-182	United States
159	Child	360	Australia
160	You Need Me, I Don't Need You	Ed Sheeran	United Kingdom
161	Truth	Alex Ebert	United States
162	No Church in the Wild	Jay Z and Kanye West featuring Frank Ocean and The-Dream	United States
163	Get Up	Stanton Warriors featuring Hollywood Holt & Ruby Goe	United Kingdom/United States
164	Blood Pressure	Mutemath	United States
165	Reptile	Calling All Cars	Australia
166	You Are a Tourist	Death Cab for Cutie	United States
167	Won't Get Lost	The Aston Shuffle	Australia
168	Always on the Run	Yuksek	France
169	The Adventures of Rain Dance Maggie	Red Hot Chili Peppers	United States
170	Slap My Elbow	S.mouse	Australia
171	On'n'On	Justice	France
172	Sophia	Laura Marling	United Kingdom
173	Anti-D	The Wombats	United Kingdom
174	Run Right Back	The Black Keys	United States
175	Hiccups	Jinja Safari	Australia
176	Guilt	Nero	United Kingdom
177	In the Summer	Loon Lake	Australia
178	Embody	Sebastian	France
179	Eskimo Boy	Strange Talk	Australia
180	Mine Is Yours	Cold War Kids	United States
181	Audio, Video, Disco	Justice	France
182	Safari Disco Club	Yelle	France
183	Stay, Please Stay	Oh Mercy	Australia
184	Down	Drapht	Australia
185	Lordy May	Boy & Bear	Australia
186	Car Song	Spank Rock featuring Santigold	United States
187	Pull Out My Insides	Does It Offend You, Yeah?	United Kingdom
188	Glorious Feeling	Joelistics	Australia
189	An Argument With Myself	Jens Lekman	Sweden
190	Numbers in Action	Wiley	United Kingdom
191	Honey	Papa vs Pretty	Australia
192	Paris Collides	Rüfüs	Australia
193	Runaway (Like a Version)	Plan B	United Kingdom
194	Codex	Radiohead	United Kingdom
195	I Know Deep Down	Architecture in Helsinki	Australia
196	Rich People Are Stupid	Ball Park Music	Australia
197	Nørgaard	The Vaccines	United Kingdom
198	The Hellcat Spangled Shalalala	Arctic Monkeys	United Kingdom
199	One of the Animals	Papa vs Pretty	Australia
200	Moves	Gold Fields	Australia

== Statistics ==
=== Artists with multiple entries ===
#	Artist	Tracks
4	Kimbra (Note: Three times solo (25, 52, 93) and once with Gotye (1))	1, 25, 52, 93
4	The Wombats	18, 24, 26, 94
3	Gotye	1, 34, 87
3	Boy & Bear	4, 49, 50
3	360	8, 37, 84
3	Florence and the Machine	13, 36, 42
3	Foster the People	14, 15, 40
3	Grouplove	16, 43, 95
3	Bon Iver	53, 66, 69
3	Skrillex (Note: Twice solo (21, 73) and one remix (39))	21, 39, 73
2	Calvin Harris	11, 30
2	Architecture in Helsinki	12, 55
2	Seeker Lover Keeper	17, 86
2	Example	27, 75
2	Owl Eyes	28, 64
2	Drapht	29, 74
2	Ball Park Music	31, 38
2	Jay-Z (Note: Twice with Kanye West)	33, 98
2	Kanye West (Note: Twice with Jay-Z)	33, 98
2	The Strokes	41, 96
2	Sparkadia	47, 56
2	Foo Fighters	63, 97
2	Little Dragon (Note: Once solo (82) and once with SBTRKT (79))	79, 82

=== Countries represented ===
Country	Total
Australia	44
United States	27
United Kingdom	25
New Zealand	4
Sweden	3
Canada	1
France	1
Italy	1
Norway	1

=== Records ===
==== Number 1 ====
- "Somebody That I Used to Know" is the first collaboration between separate artists to top the Hottest 100. It also marks the first time that the Hottest 100 and 4ZZZ's Hot 100 have featured the same winning song.
- For the second consecutive year and the third time ever, the #1 song featured a female vocalist. This was also the second consecutive year the #1 song was a duet between a male and a female artist.
- Gotye is the first artist to win the Hottest 100, the Triple J album poll and the J Award for Australian Album of the Year in the same year.
- Kimbra became the first New Zealand artist to feature in the #1 song of a Hottest 100. In addition, Kimbra's four tracks equals the record set by Lily Allen in 2006, and Florence and the Machine in 2009 for the highest total from a female artist.

==== General ====
- Producer François Tétaz helped write, produce, and mix eight songs that charted in the countdown. The songs he helped write/produce/mix were all the songs by Architecture in Helsinki, Kimbra, and Gotye.
- This is the first countdown since 1995 not to feature any previous Hottest 100 winners.
- The song "The Suburbs" by Arcade Fire charted in the countdown for the second year in a row after a cover by Mr Little Jeans featured at #100. Similarly, Owl Eyes' cover of "Pumped Up Kicks" was #28, four places higher than what the original version by Foster the People could manage the previous year.
- For the third year in a row an artist from Triple J Unearthed got in the Top 10. This year it was Boy & Bear, San Cisco and The Jezabels.
- The 2010 and 2011 Unearthed High winners (Stonefield and Snakadaktal) both made their first appearances in the Hottest 100. This is the first time this has been done.

== Top 20 Albums of 2011 ==
Note: Australian artists

This edition was hosted by Triple J presenter Caroline Tran, instead of regular presenter Richard Kingsmill. It was broadcast on 11 December 2011, the final show of "2011" for the year. It was announced that Making Mirrors won by an unprecedented margin.

Voting was held from 25 November 2011 to 10 December 2011.

Bold indicates winner of the J Award for Australian Album of the Year and Hottest 100.

#	Artist	Album	Country of origin	Tracks charted in the Hottest 100
**1**	**Gotye**	**Making Mirrors**	**Australia**	**1, 34, 87 (25 in 2010)**
2	Foster the People	Torches	United States	14, 15, 40 (32 in 2010)
3	Boy & Bear	Moonfire	Australia	4, 49, 50
4	The Wombats	This Modern Glitch	United Kingdom	18, 24, 26, 94 (8 in 2010)
5	Bon Iver	Bon Iver	United States	53, 66, 69
6	The Jezabels	Prisoner	Australia	9
7	Florence + the Machine	Ceremonials	United Kingdom	13, 36, 42
8	Architecture in Helsinki	Moment Bends	Australia	12, 55 (28 in 2008)
9	Art vs. Science	The Experiment	Australia	48 (9, 90 in 2010)
10	Ball Park Music	Happiness and Surrounding Suburbs	Australia	31, 38
11	The Strokes	Angles	United States	41, 96
12	Grouplove	Never Trust a Happy Song	United States	16, 43, 95
13	Radiohead	The King of Limbs	United Kingdom	61
14	Kimbra	Vows	New Zealand	25, 52, 93
15	Jay-Z & Kanye West	Watch the Throne	United States	33, 98
16	Drapht	The Life of Riley	Australia	29, 74 (12 in 2010)
17	Sparkadia	The Great Impression	Australia	47, 56 (24 in 2010)
18	Arctic Monkeys	Suck It and See	United Kingdom	68
19	Foo Fighters	Wasting Light	United States	63, 97
20	Cut Copy	Zonoscope	Australia	DNC (118 in Hottest 200)

=== Records ===
- For the second year in a row the ARIA Album of the Year winner came third in the Triple J Album Poll.
- Gotye is the artist since Wolfmother in 2005 to win both the Triple J Album Poll and the J Award for Australian Album of the Year. He is also the second artist to win the Triple J Album Poll twice after Radiohead.
- Cut Copy are the first band since Bloc Party in 2008 to get in the Album Poll and not feature in the Hottest 100.

== CD release ==
CD 1
1. Gotye featuring Kimbra – "Somebody That I Used to Know" (#1)
2. The Black Keys – "Lonely Boy" (#2)
3. M83 – "Midnight City" (#5)
4. Hilltop Hoods featuring Sia – "I Love It" (#10)
5. Grouplove – "Tongue Tied" (#16)
6. Skrillex – "Scary Monsters and Nice Sprites" (#21)
7. Ball Park Music – "It's Nice to Be Alive" (#31)
8. The Grates – "Turn Me On" (#54)
9. Redcoats – "Dreamshaker" (#76)
10. Hermitude – "Speak of the Devil" (#44)
11. Noah and the Whale – "L.I.F.E.G.O.E.S.O.N." (#32)
12. The Jezabels – "Endless Summer" (#9)
13. 360 Featuring Gossling – "Boys Like You" (#8)
14. Art vs. Science – "A.I.M. Fire!" (#48)
15. Sparkadia – "Mary" (#47)
16. The Drums – "Money" (#51)
17. Jebediah – "She's Like a Comet" (#70)
18. Radiohead – "Lotus Flower" (#61)
19. Snakadaktal – "Air" (#22)
20. Stonefield – "Black Water Rising" (#62)
21. Example – "Changed the Way You Kissed Me" (#27)
CD 2
1. Matt Corby – "Brother" (#3)
2. San Cisco – "Awkward" (#7)
3. Lana Del Rey – "Video Games" (#6)
4. Architecture in Helsinki – "Contact High" (#12)
5. Kimbra – "Cameo Lover" (#25)
6. Drapht – "Sing It (The Life of Riley)" (#29)
7. The Wombats – "Jump into the Fog" (#18)
8. Florence and the Machine – "Shake It Out" (#13)
9. Joe Goddard featuring Valentina – "Gabriel" (#60)
10. Boy & Bear – "Feeding Line" (#4)
11. Arctic Monkeys – "Don't Sit Down 'Cause I've Moved Your Chair" (#68)
12. Nero – "Promises" (#19)
13. Foster the People – "Helena Beat" (#15)
14. Bombay Bicycle Club – "Shuffle" (#88)
15. Seeker Lover Keeper – "Even Though I'm a Woman" (#17)
16. Calvin Harris – "Feel So Close" (#11)
17. New Navy – "Zimbabwe" (#67)
18. Bluejuice – "Act Yr Age" (#20)
19. Emma Louise – "Jungle" (#23)
20. The Rubens – "Lay It Down" (#57)
21. Pnau – "The Truth" (#80)

For the first time ever the Hottest 100 CD was released digitally on iTunes

=== DVD ===
1. Gotye featuring Kimbra – "Somebody That I Used to Know"
2. The Black Keys – "Lonely Boy"
3. Matt Corby – "Brother" (Live)
4. Boy & Bear – "Feeding Line"
5. M83 – "Midnight City"
6. San Cisco – "Awkward"
7. 360 featuring Gossling – "Boys Like You"
8. The Jezabels – "Endless Summer"
9. Hilltop Hoods featuring Sia – "I Love It"
10. Calvin Harris – "Feel So Close"
11. Architecture in Helsinki – "Contact High"
12. Florence and the Machine – "Shake It Out"
13. Foster the People – "Helena Beat"
14. Grouplove – "Tongue Tied"
15. Seeker Lover Keeper – "Even Though I'm a Woman"
16. The Wombats – "Jump into the Fog"
17. Nero – "Promises"
18. Bluejuice – "Act Yr Age"
19. Snakadaktal – "Air"
20. Emma Louise – "Jungle"
21. Kimbra – "Cameo Lover"
22. Example – "Changed the Way You Kissed Me"
23. Drapht – "Sing It (The Life of Riley)"
24. Ball Park Music – "It's Nice to Be Alive"
25. Noah and the Whale – "L.I.F.E.G.O.E.S.O.N."
26. Illy – "Cigarettes"
27. Benny Benassi featuring Gary Go – "Cinema" (Skrillex Remix)
28. Hermitude – "Speak of the Devil"
29. The Kooks – "Junk of the Heart (Happy)"
30. Active Child – "Hangin' On"
31. Sparkadia – "Mary"
32. Art vs. Science – "A.I.M. Fire!"
33. The Drums – "Money"
34. The Grates – "Turn Me On"
35. Lykke Li – "I Follow Rivers"
36. Joe Goddard featuring Valentina – "Gabriel"
37. Stonefield – "Black Water Rising"
38. Owl Eyes – "Raiders"
39. Kasabian – "Re-Wired"
40. Arctic Monkeys – "Don't Sit Down 'Cause I've Moved Your Chair"
41. Jebediah – "She's Like a Comet"
42. Husky – "History's Door"
43. Pnau – "The Truth"
44. Bubsy Marou – "Biding My Time"
45. City and Colour – "Fragile Bird"
