= 2011 in music =

This topic covers notable events and articles related to 2011 in music.

== Specific locations ==
- 2011 in American music
- 2011 in Asian music
- 2011 in British music
- 2011 in Canadian music
- 2011 in European music (Continental Europe)
- 2011 in Irish music
- 2011 in Japanese music
- 2011 in Norwegian music
- 2011 in Scandinavian music
- 2011 in South Korean music
- 2011 in Swedish music

== Specific genres ==
- Classical
- Country
- Metal
- 2011 in hip-hop
- Jazz
- Latin music
- Opera
- Progressive rock
- Rock
- K-pop

== Deaths ==
January

- 4 – Gerry Rafferty (63), Scottish singer
- 29 – Milton Babbitt (94), American jazz composer, music theorist, and teacher.

February

- 3 – Eline Nygaard Riisnæs (87), Norwegian pianist and musicologist.
- 6 – Gary Moore (58), Northern Irish musician (Thin Lizzy)
- 14 – George Shearing (91), British jazz pianist.
- 22 – Beau Dollar (69), American soul-R&B singer and drummer.

March

- 8 - Mike Starr (44), American Bassist (Alice in Chains)
- 29 – Ray Herr (63), American rock guitarist (The Ides of March).

April

- 10 – Børt-Erik Thoresen (79), Norwegian television host and folk singer.
- 22 – Eyvind Solås (74), Norwegian musician, composer, actor, and program host.
- 24 – Dag Stokke (44), Norwegian keyboardist in the band TNT, church organist and mastering engineer (cancer).
- 26 – Phoebe Snow (60), American jazz singer, songwriter, and guitarist.

May

- 7 – John Walker (67), American singer and guitarist (The Walker Brothers)
- 14 – Don Wood (61), American rock drummer (The Gants)
- 15 – Bob Flanigan (84), American jazz tenor vocalist and founding member of The Four Freshmen.
- 31 – Sølvi Wang (81), Norwegian singer and actress.

June

- 3 – Andrew Gold (59), American singer, songwriter, musician and arranger
- 20 – Ottilie Patterson (79), singer, "the godmother of British blues"

July

- 17 – Taiji Sawada, (45), Japanese heavy metal musician (X Japan, Loudness)
- 23 – Amy Winehouse (27), English rock, soul and jazz singer, and songwriter.
- 24
  - Harald Johnsen (41), Norwegian bassist (heart attack).
  - Dan Peek (60), American singer (America)
- 26 – Frank Foster (82), American tenor and soprano saxophonist, flautist, arranger, and composer.

August

- 11 – Jani Lane (47), American metal singer and songwriter (Warrant).
- 22 – Nickolas Ashford (69), American singer (Ashford & Simpson)

September

- 4 – Hilde Heltberg (51), singer songwriter (cancer).
- 7 – Eddie Marshall (73), American drummer.
- 19 – Johnny Răducanu (79), Romanian pianist.
- 21 – John Larson (61), American trumpeter (The Ides of March).

October

- 3 – Kay Armen (95), American singer.
- 8
  - Roger Williams (87), American pianist.
  - Mikey Welsh (40), American Bassist (Weezer)

November

- 3 – Andrea True (68), American singer
- 19 – Russell Garcia (95), American composer and music arranger.
- 22 – Paul Motian (80), American guitarist.

December

- 2 – Bill Tapia (103), American guitarist.
- 17 – Cesária Évora (70), Cape Verdean singer.
- 20 – Sean Bonniwell (71), American rock singer-songwriter and guitarist (The Music Machine).

== See also ==
- List of Single Top 100 number-one singles of 2011
- Timeline of musical events
- Women in music
- 2011 in television
