= 2011 in classical music =

== Events ==
- February – The Juilliard String Quartet receives the NARAS Lifetime Achievement Award for its outstanding contributions to recorded classical music.
- May 12 – The Classical Brit Awards are presented by Myleene Klass at London's Royal Albert Hall.

== New works ==
The following composers' works were composed, premiered, or published this year, as noted in the citation.

=== A ===
- Kalevi Aho – Trumpet Concerto

=== C ===
- Elliott Carter – Two Controversies and a Conversation

=== D ===
- Julius Dobos – Hymn to The Fukushima 50

=== F ===
- Francesco Filidei – Ballata, for organ, ensemble and live electronics

=== G ===
- Philip Glass – Symphony No. 9

=== H ===
- Mehdi Hosseini – Monodies

=== I ===
- Iamus (computer) – Hello World!

=== K ===
- Wojciech Kilar –
  - Lumen for mixed a cappella choir
  - Piano Concerto No. 2

=== M ===
- Paul Mealor – Ubi Caritas et Amor

=== N ===
- Per Nørgård – Symphony No. 8

=== R ===
- Christopher Rouse
  - Prospero's Rooms
  - Symphony No. 3

=== S ===
- Steven Stucky – Silent Spring

== Opera premieres ==
| Date | Opera | Composer | Theatre |
|---|---|---|---|
| 17 February | Anna Nicole | Mark-Anthony Turnage | Royal Opera House |
| 18 March | Kommilitonen! | Peter Maxwell Davies | Royal Academy of Music |
| 26 March | Risorgimento! | Lorenzo Ferrero | Teatro Comunale Modena |
| April | The Importance of Being Earnest | Gerald Barry | Los Angeles Philharmonic (concert performance) |
| 9 & 10 April | Sonntag aus Licht | Karlheinz Stockhausen | Staatenhaus of the Kölner Messe (auspices of the Cologne Opera) |
| 13 April | The Juniper Passion | Michael F. Williams | Gallagher Academy of Performing Arts, University of Waikato |
| 9 June | Rockland the Opera | Jukka Linkola | Nivala Ice Arena, Finland |
| 24 June | Two Boys | Nico Muhly | English National Opera |
| 1 July | Dr Dee | Damon Albarn | Palace Theatre, Manchester, 2011 Manchester International Festival |
| 30 July | Mansfield Park | Jonathan Dove | Boughton House |
| 11 September | Manifest Destiny 2011 | Keith Burstein | King's Head Theatre, London |
| 15 October | One Night Stand | Olli Kortekangas | Helsinki Music Centre |
| 1 November | Heart of Darkness | Tarik O'Regan | Linbury Studio Theatre, Royal Opera House |
| 12 November | Silent Night | Kevin Puts | Ordway Center for the Performing Arts, Saint Paul, Minnesota |
| 31 December | The Enchanted Island | Handel, Vivaldi, Rameau | Metropolitan Opera |

== Albums ==
- Nicola Benedetti – Italia
- Andrea Bocelli – Concerto: One Night in Central Park
- Joseph Calleja – The Maltese Tenor
- Jackie Evancho – Dream With Me
- Wynne Evans – A Song In My Heart
- Angela Gheorghiu – Homage to Maria Callas
- Katherine Jenkins – Daydream
- Miloš Karadaglić – The Guitar
- Oregon Symphony – Music for a Time of War
- André Rieu & the Johann Strauss Orchestra – Moonlight Serenade

== Musical films ==
- Violin

== Deaths ==
- January 24 – Bhimsen Joshi, Indian classical vocalist, 88
- January 28 – Dame Margaret Price, Welsh operatic soprano, 69
- February 2 – Armando Chin Yong, 52, Malaysian opera singer
- February 5 – Beatrice Krebs, 86, American mezzo-soprano
- February 6 – Per Grundén, 88, Swedish tenor
- February 10 – Claus Helmut Drese, 88, German opera manager
- February 21 – Antonín Švorc, 77, Czech bass-baritone
- February 26 – Eugene Fodor, US violinist, 60
- March 13 – Hans Christian, 81, Austrian baritone
- March 22 – Victor Bouchard, Canadian pianist and composer, 84
- March 28 – Lee Hoiby, 85, American composer and pianist
- March 29 – Robert Tear, Welsh operatic tenor and conductor, 72
- April 8 – Donald Shanks, 70, Australian bass-baritone
- April 8 – Daniel Catán, 62, Mexican composer
- April 15 – Vincenzo La Scola, Italian operatic tenor, 53 (heart attack)
- May 7 – Jane Rhodes, 82, French soprano/mezzo-soprano
- May 30 – Giorgio Tozzi, 88, American bass
- July 4 – Gerhard Unger, 95, German tenor
- July 6 – Josef Suk, Czech violinist and conductor, 81
- July 23 – David Aiken, 93, American baritone
- July 26 – Denise Scharley, French operatic contralto, 94
- August 1 – Milada Šubrtová, Czech operatic soprano, 87
- August 2 – Ralph Berkowitz, US composer and painter, 100
- August 3 – Louise Behrend, US violinist and academic, 94
- August 25 – Anne Sharp, 94, Scottish coloratura soprano
- September 5 – Salvatore Licitra, 43, Italian tenor
- September 29 – Vera Veljkov-Medaković, Serbian pianist and piano teacher, 88
- October 8 – Ingvar Wixell, Swedish operatic baritone, 80
- October 19 – James Yannatos, US composer conductor, violinist and teacher, 82
- October 29 – Walter Norris, American pianist and composer, 79
- November 22 – Sena Jurinac, Bosnian operatic soprano, 90
- November 23 – Montserrat Figueras, Catalan operatic soprano, 70
- December 5 – Violetta Villas, Polish coloratura soprano, cabaret star, singer, actress, composer and songwriter, 73
- December 8 – Minoru Miki, 81, Japanese composer

== Major awards ==
=== International Tchaikovsky Competition 2011 – Piano ===
- Daniil Trifonov

=== International Tchaikovsky Competition 2011 – Violin ===
- No first prize awarded. Sergey Dogadin and Itamar Zorman share second prize.

=== 2011 International Franz Liszt Piano Competition ===
- Masataka Goto

=== BBC Cardiff Singer of the World competition ===
- Valentina Naforniţă

=== Classical Brits ===
- Composer of the Year – Arvo Pärt
- Male Artist of the Year – Antonio Pappano
- Female Artist Of The Year – Alison Balsom
- Critics' Award – Tasmin Little
- Artist of the Decade – Il Divo

=== Grammy Awards ===
- See 53rd Grammy Awards
