= The Trainer =

Play written by Keith Burstein

- Written by: David Wilson and Anne Aylor (with Keith Burstein)
- Genre: Political

Premiere
- Date: 2009
- Place: United Kingdom

The Trainer is a play by David Wilson and Anne Aylor (with writing contributions from composer Keith Burstein).

== Description ==
The Trainer is a multi-media play set in a posh gym in the basement of a gentlemen’s club, punctuated with excerpts from the (real life) opera Manifest Destiny, news footage from Gaza and inane breakfast TV programmes. It delivers a darkly comical comment on the justice system, while at the same time highlighting the struggles taking place both in Gaza and in the UK and other Western countries to defend humanity from barbarism.

== Synopsis ==
The play explores the love story between a British Jew, Josh, and his Palestinian fiancée Taghreed (who works as a fitness trainer at the gym in a London gentlemen's club). Their story is interwoven with a predominantly fact-based account of the real-life bankruptcy of British composer Keith Burstein (as the result of a libel trial relating to issues of alleged promotion of terrorism) as told by the attendees of the gym in which Taghreed works (all of whom happen to be Judges of the Court of Appeal).

== Background ==
After Keith Burstein and Dic Edwards’ opera Manifest Destiny was performed at the 2005 Edinburgh Festival Fringe the London Evening Standard newspaper published a review which claimed that the opera glorified terrorism. Burstein subsequently took the newspaper to court on the grounds that this claim put him at risk under the terms of the Terrorism Acts of 2005 and 2006. The High Court found in his favour and granted him the right to take the case to a trial by jury. However, this decision was reversed in the Court of Appeal, which ordered Burstein to pay the legal costs of the London Evening Standard (some £70,000). In consequence, Burstein was bankrupted and the Official Receiver seized possession of all of his works (including Manifest Destiny).

The court case and its aftermath inspired David Wilson and Anne Aylor (in collaboration with Burstein) to write The Trainer. The play covers a fictionalised version of the events of the trial, in parallel with a separate plot strand similar to one used in Manifest Destiny (that of an educated Palestinian woman with a Jewish lover, driven towards acts of violence in response to the state violence demonstrated in the Middle Eastern conflicts of the late 20th and early 21st centuries).

== Performance history ==
The Trainer premiered at Oxford House, London, in March 2009. Actors involved included Corin Redgrave, Tim Pigott-Smith and Lebanese-American actress Jana Zeineddine.

Following rewrites, The Trainer was revived for the fundraising evening Two Plays For Gaza on May 21, 2009 at the Hackney Empire theatre in London, UK (which also featured a performance of Caryl Churchill's play Seven Jewish Children, talks by Tony Benn and Ben Griffin, and music from Reem Kelani and hip-hop poet Lowkey). For this production, actors Janie Dee and Roger Lloyd-Pack joined the cast.

Both productions were directed by Tom Platten.
