= Chen Rong =

Chen Rong may refer to:

- Chen Rong (painter) (ca. 1200–1266), painter of the Southern Song dynasty
- Chen Rong (athlete) (born 1988), Chinese long-distance runner
- Chen Rong (footballer) (born 2001), Chinese association footballer

== See also ==
- Shen Rong (born 1936), Chinese writer, also known as Chen Rong
- Armando Chin Yong (1958–2011), also known as Chen Rong, Malaysian opera singer
