= 2011 International Franz Liszt Piano Competition =

The IX International Franz Liszt Piano Competition took place in Utrecht from March 25 to April 8, 2011. The competition was won by Masataka Goto. Olga Kozlova and Oleksandr Poliykov were awarded the 2nd and 3rd prizes.

== Jury and results ==
  - (Netherlands) Lucas Vis (chairman)
  - (Brazil) Arnaldo Cohen
  - (Russia) Nikolai Demidenko
  - (Brazil) Cristina Ortiz
  - (Italy) Enrico Pace
  - (United States) Jerome Rose
  - (Lithuania) Mūza Rubackytė
  - (Hungary) Tamás Vásáry
  - (Netherlands) Jan Wijn

| Contestants Qualified after the 2010 International Selection Rounds | R1 | SF | F |
|---|---|---|---|
| (Taiwan) Yen-Yu Chen | | | |
| (Bulgaria) Dimitar Dimitrov | | | |
| (Croatia) Goran Filipec | | | |
| (Japan) Masataka Goto | | | Gold medal |
| (Russia) Elena Gurina | | | |
| (South Korea) Sooyeun Han | | | |
| (United States) Dr. Michael Kaykov | | | |
| (Ukraine) Dinara Klinton | | | |
| (Russia) Olga Kozlova | | | Silver medal |
| (Taiwan) Yun Yang Lee | | | |
| (Russia) Nikolay Leshchenko | | | |
| (Italy) Vincenzo Maltempo | | | |
| (Estonia) Hando Nahkur | | | |
| (Japan) Nariya Nogi | | | |
| (China) Linzi Pan | | | |
| (South Korea) Jin Woo Park | | | |
| (Bulgaria) Ivan Penkov | | | |
| (Ukraine) Ilya Petrov | | | |
| (Ukraine) Oleksandr Poliykov | | | Bronze medal |
| (Russia) Dmitry Rodionov | | | |
| (Japan) Tomoki Sakata | | | |
| (Russia) Alexey Sychev | | | |

== See also ==
- International Franz Liszt Piano Competition
