= Rikard Schwarz =

Croatian composer, conductor and music writer

- Born: Rikard Dundo Schwarz (sometimes written Švarc or Schwartz); September 20, 1897; Zagreb, Croatia-Slavonia, Austria-Hungary
- Died: 1941 (aged 43–44); Jasenovac, Independent State of Croatia
- Era: 20th century

Rikard Schwarz (20 September 1897, in Zagreb – late 1941, in Jasenovac), Croatian composer, conductor and music writer.

== Early life and education ==
He was born into a Zagreb Jewish family that came from Nagykanizsa in Hungary. His father Ljudevit, a lawyer and politician (Zagreb, 1858 – Zagreb, 1943) was the first Jewish representative in the Croatian parliament (1887 – 1906 and 1910 – 1913), a representative in the Croatian-Hungarian parliament in Budapest (1892 – 1913) and a city councillor in the Zagreb city assembly (1892 – 1904). Rikard's mother Irda (Sida) née Kraus, 1870, died in Zagreb on February 6, 1904, leaving four motherless children: Rikard and his brother Vilim, and daughters Nada and Anamarija.

Rikard acquired his elementary and high school education in Zagreb. At the same time he received his musical training at the school of the Croatian Music Institute in Zagreb, where he studied violin in the class of Vàclav Huml, piano in the class of Ernest Krauth and theory with Franjo Dugan and Fran Lhotka.

== Music career ==
Just before matriculation, he started composing, and wrote his first pieces, devoted to the piano: Little Prelude (April 20, 1916) and Andante (August 18, 1916). In the same year, inspired by the verses of the Croatian poet Dragutin Domjanić, Rikard Schwarz composed two solo songs entitled In the Mystic Night and Dead Lake. His early composing activity was brought to a sudden stop by the war and his mobilisation. At that time, Schwarz composed All in Vain (June 17, 1917), another solo song, for soprano and piano, to verses of Vladimir Nazor. On his return from the army in 1918, at his father's wish, he started a course of chemistry at the Engineering Faculty in Zagreb (1918/1919), soon transferring to the Technical High School in Vienna.

The rich musical life of Vienna and the firm belief that he had a musical vocation headed him in the direction of art, however, and in 1919 he enrolled as a full-time student at the Staatsakademie für Musik und darstellende Kunst in Vienna. In Vienna Rikard attended the lectures of Arnold Schoenberg, Alban Berg and Joseph Marx and studied piano with Franz Joseph Moser, as well as conducting at Ludwig Kaiser's. In the bosom of the then contemporary school of Arnold Schoenberg, and tutored by Alban Berg, in his Viennese period, Schwarz composed eight pieces: Sonata for Violin and Piano in C Minor, Variationen und Fugato über ein Menuetto von Mozart für Klavier 2hdg, Fünf Lieder nach Gedichten aus “Arabischen Nächten” von Hans Bethge, String Quartet in B Flat Major, the solo songs Sometimes Happens from a cycle by Rainer Maria Rilke Die frühen Gedichte (1919), Prelude for piano (1921), two choral pieces for Yiddish texts Inser rebenju and Kinder kimt and the orchestral ballad Under the Deck (for baritone and orchestra) after Nazor's miniature cycle of Galley Slaves. Also to be found in the Schwarz papers is a fragment of a Lullaby for violin and orchestra, or perhaps piano and the score of a Romantic Symphony composed in Novi Sad in 1938.

After completing his studies, in 1922 Rikard went back to Zagreb where, wishing to show his Viennese works, on September 28, 1922, he put on a composer's evening in the Croatian Music Institute. The reviewing acknowledged his skill as a composer. He found a market for the Violin Sonata in C Minor and the String Quartet in B Flat Major (which is not now in existence) in Vienna and Southampton. Schwarz, as he writes himself gave up studying in Vienna “for financial reasons”, and continued his musical career, mainly teaching, conducting and journalism, in Osijek and Split. Along with Maks Unger, in Osijek was one of the creators of the idea that the Music School should be turned into the City Conservatory. He drew up the curriculum of the conservatory and created its library on the model of the scientific plan of the Zagreb Conservatory.

From 1924, he worked as opera conductor in the National Theatre, as choir master of the Kuhač Singing Association, as teacher in the City Conservatory, and music critic in the papers Die Drau, Kazališni list, Jugoslovenski muzičar and Hrvatski list. Very often, along with Lav Mirski, he conducted the Osijek Philharmonic Orchestra and operetta performances. Financial difficulties in the music department of the Osijek Theatre and the Philharmonic resulted in his relocation to Split, where at the end of 1926 he was at work in the Opera. In Split, on April 1, 1927, in collaboration with the violinist Mary Žeželj and the pianist Jelka Karlovac he founded a private school. The short stay in Split was very fruitful for Schwarz, for as well as teaching, he also directed the orchestra and choir of the Zvonimir Singing Association and put on symphony concert with the Split Philharmonic Orchestra. He went on working as a music reviewer in Novo doba and Jutarnji list. Since during his stay in Split, Schwarz was still under contract to Osijek and its theatre, whose operetta ensemble moved to Belgrade, Schwarz had to change homes again, which, rather against his wishes, determined his further career.

From 1927, he continued his work in teaching as piano and theory teacher at the Stanković Music School in Belgrade, where from November 12, 1929 to 1937 he was assistant director. He wrote for Glasnik Muzičkog društva Stanković. In 1929, with the composers Miloje Milojević and Kosta Manojlović, he started off the periodical Muzika. He developed his writing career providing material for Zvuk, Radio Beograd, Muzičar and the papers Morgenblatt, Židov and Sportsko-turistički Lloyd. As well as reviews, he often wrote on topics from the history of music. It was with lectures in musical history that he worked in the Kolarac People's University from 1934 to 1938, and as conductor of the orchestra of the Stanković School, he prepared an opera class, which he took to the National Theatre, performing Gluck, Pergolesi and Mozart.

The last phase of his career as composer and conductor is related to Novi Sad. The Isidor Bajić Music School underwent a “period of invaluable revival” when Rikard Schwarz was its director, from 1936 to 1940, undertaking numerous activities and reaping considerable success. He ran the music school under the title People's Conservatory, and put on “popular concerts with lectures and the participation of soloists, a school choir and orchestra.”

== Later years ==
In Novi Sad in 1938, Rikard Schwarz became a father, to Lujo (Ludvig-Milorad), but his wife Verica, née Jovanović, died after the delivery.

In 1940 he was mobilised and sent to Sarajevo and Macedonia. After the April War, in 1941 he fled from Novi Sad to Zagreb, where his father, sister and son were staying.

On June 30, 1941, he was arrested and taken to the Zagreb Fair, whence on July 2 or 3 he was sent to Gospić, then to the Slana Camp in Pag, and finally to Krapje (Jasenovac I). Schwarz's father, a politician in the Croatian Parliament, unsuccessfully attempted to appeal for his son's release. According to the available information he died of starvation and exhaustion before the end of 1941. His brother, Vilim, was killed at a camp in 1945.

== Oeuvre ==
The composition oeuvre of Rikard Schwarz can be analysed from the 27 existing works. His earlier works were created in Vienna between 1918 and 1921, and they show harmonic audacity and an aspiration to a more modern music expression on the model of the composers of the 2nd Viennese School, but at the same time a divergence in the direction of neo-Classicism can be seen (Sonata for Violin and Piano in C Minor, 1921). Particularly interesting for music in Croatia are the first solo songs to texts by Domjanić and Nazor, because of the relationship between textural original and the vocal and instrumental part. In his manner of treating the piano part as against the vocal part and the manner in which the text is declaimed in some parts he shows a contemporary idiom and an affinity for the modern. Schwarz's most radical advance came in the 2nd String Quartet and in the piano composition Albumblatt where he abandoned the prop of tonality. He returned to neo-Classicism with his last opus, Romantic Symphony of 1938.

Instrumental works comprehend piano works created between 1915 and 1938. In manuscript there is the composition Untitled (Zagreb, 1915), Small Prelude (Zagreb, 1916), Prelude (Vienna, 1921), Variationen und Fugato über ein Menuetto von Mozart für Klavier 2hdg (Beč, 1922), Albumblatt (Zagreb, 1923?) as well as Piano Sketch for an Unknown Stage Piece (about 1937 – 1938?). In 1935 the State printing works in Belgrade printed the composition Solemn Music in Celebration of October 27, 1935.

== Legacy ==
In 1995, several previously unknown works by Schwartz were discovered in archives, including Variationen und Fugato über ein Menuetto von Mozart für Klavier 2hdg. (1922), Children's Suite for piano (1935), and Solemn Music in honour of October 27, 1935 for piano (1935).

== Works ==
- Untitled for piano (1915)
- Dead Lake for alto and piano (1916)
- Little Preludes for piano (1916)
- In Mystical Nights for mezzo-soprano and piano (1917)
- Sometimes it Is So for alto and piano (1919)
- Below Decks, ballad for baritone and orchestra (1921)
- Fünf Lieder nach Gedichten aus den "Arabischen Nächten" (1921)
- Inser rebenju for male choir (1921)
- Prelude for piano (1921)
- Sonata for violin and piano in C minor (1921)
- Kinder kimt for mixed choir (1922)
- Variationen und Fugato über ein Menuetto von Mozart für Klavier 2hdg. (1922)
- Albumblatt for piano (1923)
- Schluf man Kind for soprano and mixed choir (1923)
- Quartet No 2 (1924)
- Children's Suite for piano (1935)
- Solemn Music in honour of October 27, 1935 for piano (1935)
- Dreams for a Proper Real Life for mixed choir (1938)
- Romantic Symphony in C minor (1938)
- Spring Prayer for Words for female choir (1938)
- Lieder
- Have Faith in God (Border Guards) for mixed choir and orchestra
- Musical Numbers for the play "Izmira" for mixed choir and orchestra
