= Keith Burstein =

British composer (born 1957)

Keith Burstein born 1957 as Keith Burston (the anglicised form adopted by his father of the surname, which Burstein later dropped) is an English composer, conductor and music theorist with Jewish family origins. He is noted for his fervent championing of tonal music as a valid contemporary composing style.

== Musical approach and philosophy (including theory of "Super Tonality") ==
Keith Burstein's early musical approach was informed by the culture of atonalism in which he was educated at the Royal College of Music, and his early compositions were written in the atonal style. Burstein made a dramatic shift towards composing tonally during the late 1980s. In a 2002 interview with The Independent newspaper, he reflected "What had happened to me was a sort of Damascene conversion, I suppose. I suddenly saw that atonalism was a dead end. Once you accept that melody is everywhere, and always has been, in folk music and pop and rock, you see that it's not reactionary to write a tune." He began pursuing tonal composition and reinvestigating more traditional forms such as requiems, church chorales and brass band music. Although both Burstein (and various critics) have sometimes dubbed his style as "neo-romantic", he has stated that his education in atonalism has informed his musical approach. He has been described by the Hampstead & Highgate Express (in a review of his Symphony No. 1) as "a contemporary master of tonality" and by The Daily Telegraph as "an ardent new romantic post-modernist."

"Any student of Western classical music knows that one of the defining characteristics of its greatest works is the balance of intellect and emotion, the two working in perfect harmony. The people need a music of the spirit that once again seeks and finds that mysterious balance of heart and mind."

— Keith Burstein on reasserting balance in classical music

Burstein has developed his approach into a theory he initially dubbed "Romantic Futurism", realigned as "New Tonalism" and now calls "Super Tonality". He views this approach as a fusion (or reintegration) of atonal and tonal composition – in which tonality is used to release the expressive power of dissonance – and considers it to represent "(a) wider horizon… that carries atonalism and all the other -isms with it, and creates a forward-looking fusion." Super Tonality acknowledges the philosophy and reasoning behind the original atonal experiments of Arnold Schoenberg, Anton Webern and others, but strongly questions the dominance of these and related forms in contemporary classical music and in modern music critical theory. Burstein has also suggested that this style of music can be composed by musicians (such as himself) "who were fired in the white heat of the atonal avant-garde and who dedicated themselves to that depth of knowledge and practise within the most highly-charged furnaces of experiment". He has cited Arvo Pärt as one of the other composers whom he believes is working in this area.

Burstein's outspoken stance has sometimes led to friction between himself and others in the contemporary classical music establishment. He has accused "moribund atonalist dogma" of having stifled musical debate in the world of contemporary classical music. He has also challenged the idea that "the intrinsic worth of a musical piece is defined solely by its 'intellectual' content; and that the degree of intellectuality is signified entirely by the degree of atonalism involved in its construction."

Burstein is also known for a strong commitment to humanism and to issues of social concern. This is expressed in the subject matter of several of his works, including The Year's Midnight – A Meditation on the Holocaust (2000) and the opera Manifest Destiny (2004, revised as Manifest Destiny 2011 in 2011), in which would-be suicide bombers reject violence in favour of a desire for peace. He is associated with the Stop The War Coalition, giving press conferences with Bianca Jagger and Walter Wolfgang and performing benefits alongside Julie Christie and Michael Nyman.

== Biography and career ==
=== Family background ===
Keith Burstein was born in the English coastal town of Brighton: his birth name was "Keith Burston", and he was one of the two sons of Samuel and Barbara Burston. The family surname was an Anglicised version of Burstein, the original Russian-Jewish family name of Samuel Burston's ancestors (who emigrated to the UK in the late nineteenth century). The family was musical – Keith's parents, uncles and aunts were all orchestral musicians, and one of his cousins is the composer Paul Lewis. Both Samuel and Barbara Burston were orchestral violinists and had played in the orchestras for the Royal Opera House and Sadler's Wells Theatre as well as the Royal Philharmonic Orchestra and the BBC Ulster Orchestra. They also played in the Hallé Orchestra, Manchester (during which time Samuel Burston had enjoyed a close rapport with the conductor Sir John Barbirolli.)

Keith Burstein reassumed his original family name in the late 1980s, at the same time that he was discovering his own voice as a composer. He has commented that this was part of a process of self-discovery at the time, and not related to religious beliefs. However, he has also noted that his Jewish ancestry perhaps formed a "subliminal linkage" to his decision to compose the Holocaust-themed choral work The Year’s Midnight in 2000.

=== Musical education ===
Originally tutored in piano by Hove-based music teacher Christine Pembridge, Keith Burstein attended the Royal College of Music from 1977 (where he held two scholarships). While attending the college, he studied composition with Bernard Stevens and John Lambert. During this time he was exposed for the first time to the contemporary classical music of Karlheinz Stockhausen and Pierre Boulez, and became a committed enthusiast for atonal and experimental music. After graduation, he studied with Jonathan Harvey on a Ralph Vaughan Williams Trust bursary. Burstein has commented that at the time of his studies there was widespread talk of a "malaise", or "vacuum" in contemporary classical music, but that there were no simultaneous ideas regarding how this problem might be solved.

=== Early musical career and the Grosvenor Group ===
Keith Burstein initially made his name as a conductor and commissioner of contemporary music – primarily as founder of chamber ensemble The Grosvenor Group (not to be confused with the property company of the same name). This ensemble existed between 1983 and 1993 and performed works by Schoenberg, Webern, Stockhausen, Harrison Birtwistle, Edward Elgar, Brian Ferneyhough, Oliver Knussen, Mark-Anthony Turnage and Luciano Berio among others. Burstein has subsequently described the ensemble as "an attempt to explore the landscape and to find a pathway forward". The group received considerable critical acclaim during its existence. In a 1986 review of one of their concerts, The Times newspaper commented that "they played as though their very lives depended upon it."

However, Burstein's priorities were beginning to alter due to his growing interest as a composer in reassessing and reincorporating tonality into contemporary music. Although the Grosvenor Group performed three of Burstein's compositions during its lifetime, these were atonal works inspired by his education at the Royal College of Music. Burstein would eventually sideline his conducting work (and end his commissioning work) in favour of full-time composing.

After the dissolution of the Grosvenor Group, several members went on to join the Chamber Orchestra of Europe. Burstein continued to compose for varied groups of musicians, covering ensemble pieces, choral and solo vocal music and large-scale orchestral works. Some members of the Grosvenor Group would continue to collaborate with him as part of an occasional musical group called the Keith Burstein Ensemble.

=== Work premiered during the early 1990s ===
Keith Burstein's first substantial tonal work was the Marchioness Requiem (composed between 1991 and 1993), an eighty-minute work commissioned as a memorial for the victims of the Marchioness disaster and scored for large chorus, soloists and orchestra. A chamber version of this work has been performed many times, although the full score remains unperformed.

During this period, Burstein premiered his work at a variety of unusual London venues. These included St Bride's Church, Westminster Cathedral Hall, the Design Museum, Conway Hall, and St James Garlickhythe Church. Other compositions written and performed during this decade included the sixteen-song cycle Songs of Love for vocal soloists and ensemble (1990), the choral/organ piece Hymns Of Benediction (1991), and 1994's Prayer For Peace (another vocal-soloists-and-ensemble piece). Burstein also wrote two pieces for the 26-piece BT Brass Band – 1991's Eternal City and 1994's Leavetaking. The former was described by The Independent Magazine as "messianic, mystical, visionary... a spectacularly doomy piece for massed brass, all heart – bursting chords and cascading scales", while What's On Magazine drew attention to the "axis of largely consonant harmonies, lifting stray phrases high above the main architecture."

The Guardian, by contrast, found that Eternal City made "all the intellectual demands of Mills and Boon pulp fiction; it deals in emotional commonplaces. It's music by the yard. The conspiracy among BBC and critics claimed by Burstein and his allies is wrongly identified: it isn't a conspiracy against conservative neo-romanticism, it's against bad music like this". Many years later (in late 2009) Burstein would retrospectively challenge these accusations in the composer's notes on his homepage; pointing out that the sophisticated use of polyphony and dissonance in Eternal City was belied by the review, stating that the BBC and critics had generally represented him fairly, and querying the logic that states that neo-romanticism is inherently conservative.

=== Work premiered during the late 1990s ===
In 1995, Burstein composed A Live Flame (In memoriam John Smith MP) for orchestra and tenor. A memorial piece for the late leader of the British Labour Party, it was premiered in 1997 by London Musici at St John's, Smith Square, London, with tenor soloist Richard Coxon. The composition was described by The Sunday Times as being "nothing short of alchemy" and by the London Evening Standard as being "dignified and beautiful."

In 1996, Burstein met and talked with the Estonian composer Arvo Pärt, who was subsequently to become a mentor. Pärt was instrumental in gaining Burstein a commission to write music for the nine-hundredth anniversary celebrations of Norwich Cathedral. Pärt had already secured the commission for his own composition I Am The True Vine but opted to split the commission fee and opportunity with Burstein, who contributed his own Missa Brevis to the concerts.

In a 3 June 1997 article announcing the premiere of A Live Flame, The Times described Burstein as a "composer who used to organise bands of hecklers to go about wrecking performances of modern atonal music, particularly anything by Sir Harrison Birtwhistle." Burstein successfully sued Times Newspapers Ltd. for libel in 2000, pointing out that he had "never interrupted any concert or performance of any sort. It would have been inconceivable to interrupt anybody's performance." In court, it was demonstrated that The Hecklers' demonstration had taken place during the audience applause following the Royal Opera House performance of Birtwistle's Gawain. The booing was deemed by the court to have constituted legitimate comment/response rather than an interruption or "wrecking". Burstein was awarded £8000 in damages.

The last Burstein piece premiered during the 1990s was The Gates Of Time (written for chamber orchestra, choir and soprano soloist). This was commissioned by The Thomas Tallis Society of Greenwich to mark the Millennium. It was premiered at St Alfege Church, Greenwich, London, during October 1999.

=== Work premiered during the early 2000s (2000–2003) ===
The success of The Gates Of Time led to a second Millennium commission from The Thomas Tallis Society to mark The Millennium. As with The Gates Of Time, this work was to be premiered at St Alfege Church, Greenwich, London. In consequence, Burstein composed a work covering the story of the martyrdom of the church's patron saint – Alfege (for orchestra and choir plus soprano/tenor/bass soloists) was first performed in 2000.

Two works commissioned for Jewish music ensembles followed. The first of these was The Year’s Midnight – A Meditation on The Holocaust written for chamber orchestra, choir, and tenor/soprano/mezzo-soprano soloists. Commissioned and performed by the Zemel Choir, this work was premiered at St John's, Smith Square, London in 2000 (and broadcast the following year on BBC Radio 4 as part of their Holocaust Memorial Day). Burstein's String Quartet no. 1: Dance Of Death/Dream Of Love was premiered and commissioned by the Bochmann String Quartet (funded by the Jewish Musical Institute) at the Bridewell Theatre in London, March 2002.

During 2001 and 2002, Burstein worked on a science-fiction opera called The Furthering. The first half of the opera was completed and premiered as a run-through at Battersea Arts Centre, London in May 2002, directed by Stewart Lee. The opera remains uncompleted, but Burstein now plans to incorporate it into an opera trilogy.

Burstein was profoundly affected by the Al-Queda attacks of 11 September 2001 and the subsequent invasions of Afghanistan and Iraq. His subsequent work as a composer began to reflect this. Songs Against War (settings of poems by Keith Douglas, Wilfred Owen, Lemn Sissay and Ben Okri, performed by mezzo-soprano soloist and piano) was premiered at the Cockpit Theatre in London in October 2001. The pace of world events would inform his next major project – the opera Manifest Destiny. The first commercial recorded release of a Burstein piece would also happen in late 2001, with the release of Three Preludes (for solo piano) as part of the 'Four Seasons Singles Club: Autumn' release on Day Release Records.

=== Manifest Destiny (2004, revived 2011) ===
In 2003, seeking collaborators for an opera taking the "War on Terror" as its subject, Burstein advertised for a librettist. The post was filled by controversial Welsh playwright Dic Edwards, and the two subsequently wrote the opera Manifest Destiny.

Manifest Destiny was set in London, Palestine, Afghanistan, Washington, D.C. and Guantanamo Bay and featured a thematic backdrop of the contemporary unrest in the Middle East (including the Second Intifada) and the aftermath of the Al-Qaeda attacks (including the invasions of Afghanistan and Iraq, and the establishment of Guantanamo Bay.) Its central plot element dealt with the plight, motivations and fate of several Palestinians drawn into the world of suicide bombing tactics, which they ultimately rejected in favour of a wounded yet hopeful peace with their neighbours. The opera also heavily satirised the geopolitical landscape.

The first act was premiered at the Cockpit Theatre, London, 2003. A subsequent full-length performance (with minimal staging) was put on at the Tricycle Theatre, London in 2004 (produced by Corin Redgrave). A fully staged production followed, staged at the 2005 Edinburgh Festival Fringe. For each of these productions, Burstein provided the sole musical accompaniment (on piano). The actors Corin and Vanessa Redgrave helped with the first London production, with Corin as producer. The artist Ralph Steadman designed the artwork and when the production went up to the Edinburgh Festival in 2005 Steadman donated some sixty of his drawings to use as backdrops.

Manifest Destiny gained a great deal of press attention due to its topical and controversial subject matter, including scenes showing the preparations for a suicide bomb raid and the incarceration and maltreatment of one protagonist in Camp X-Ray (a scene written prior to public knowledge of the events at Abu Ghraib. Both Burstein and Edwards were quick to stress that the opera did not endorse the actions of suicide bombers, and in fact displayed them ultimately rejecting their violent course of action. In an interview with a Canadian radio station, Burstein describes the core of the opera as being "one in which despair miraculously turns into hope, violence into compassion, hatred into respect."

Critical response to Manifest Destiny was varied, with some publications praising the opera and others attacking it. Scotland on Sunday described Manifest Destiny as " a dazzling, dark opera... affecting, bold, potent and packed with melodic invention" and praised it for marrying "the personal with the political, the particular and the universal.". The Daily Telegraph, while describing the libretto as "stilted", and the political message as "banal and fatally one-sided", also noted its "rigorous and high-minded" nature with a story "in the environs of Greek tragedy". The British Theatre Guide' described it as "a powerful piece, powerfully performed… one to be cherished," and backed up the creators' view that "it is right that opera should take on such subjects".

More negative reviews came from Anna Picard in The Independent who criticised the "narrowness of its harmonic language and the robotic word-setting" and likened it to "sixth-form satire", and Veronica Lee in the London Evening Standard who described the libretto as "horribly leaden and unmusical" and the music as "uninspiring", adding, "the idea that there is anything heroic about suicide bombers is, frankly, a grievous insult." The Evening Standard review led Burstein to bring a libel action against Associated Newspapers, on the grounds that terms used in the review left him open to the risk of state prosecution under both the recently passed Prevention of Terrorism Act of 2005 (which explicitly names "promotion of terrorism" as a criminal act) and the incoming Terrorism Act of 2006 (at the time, a Terrorism Bill) which featured a retrospective "glorification of terrorism" clause. Burstein's action was unsuccessful and he was subsequently ordered to pay £67,000 in legal fees to the newspaper. Although Burstein subsequently took the case to the European Court of Human Rights his application was rejected.

The Evening Standard case inspired a subsequent play – The Trainer, written by David Wilson and Anne Aylor (with co-writes by Burstein). Premiered at Oxford House, London, in March 2009, and subsequently at the Hackney Empire, the play is a fictionalised version of the events of the trial, in parallel with a separate plot strand echoing that of Manifest Destiny. Actors involved in the production included Corin Redgrave and Tim Pigott-Smith who played Burstein, Janie Dee and Roger Lloyd-Pack.

=== Recent work (2006–present) ===
In 2009 Burstein completed his Piano Sonata No 2 Perpetually Descending Veils Through Blazes of Light, written for Evelyne Berezovsky, daughter of the concert pianist Boris Berezovsky.

Also in 2009, Burstein completed Symphony (Elixir), written for and performed by the Southbank Sinfonia. A review of the concert performance (from the Hampstead & Highgate Express), described the composer as "a contemporary master of tonality", remarking upon a "sound palette that sparkled with energy" and Burstein's "clear and lucid writing (which) captivated the ear", also noting that there was "no aural gulf" between the piece and Mozart's Linz Symphony (which was being performed on the same bill). During the course of his work on the Symphony Burstein received encouragement from the pianist and conductor Vladimir Ashkenazy. The three movements of Symphony (Elixir) were performed separately by Southbank Sinfonia over the next few years. The completed work was first performed in its entirety by Kauno Miesto Simfonis Orkestras (conducted by Burstein) in late 2012 in a concert which also featured Burstein's song cycle Songs of Love & Solitude, sung by Lithuanian mezzo-soprano Rita Novikaite. The performance was recorded and subsequently released on Naxos in December 2013.

In September 2011, Burstein rewrote Manifest Destiny for a new production by the London-based opera company OperaUpClose, resulting in a new opera called Manifest Destiny 2011. The production ran for nine performances (including four previews and a press night). Changes from the original opera including the removal of the notorious suicide bomb-robing scene (and of the character of the suicide bomber Omah), the conflation of three other characters into one (the Director of CIA character) and a much increased emphasis on metaphysical content (including references to Gaia and classical mythology). Burstein also provided a quintet orchestration for the revised work and conducted the ensemble himself. As had been the case with the earlier versions of the opera, Manifest Destiny 2011 received mixed reviews. The Opera Up Close performances were generally praised, but there were varied reactions to the music, libretto and plot.

Burstein is currently working on a new opera and his Second Symphony 'Herald'.

Burstein's opera The Prometheus Revolution was premiered in August 2018 at The Arcola Theatre as part of their annual Grimeborn opera Festival. The production was directed by Sophie Gilpin, who gave three performances. A number of reviews appeared, including in Opera Magazine, Planet Hugill, TheatreCat and the event was also covered by Sky News, Russia Today TV, London Live TV and Monocle Radio, all of whom gave extended interviews to the composer. One of the performances was attended by John McDonnell MP, Shadow Chancellor of the Exchequer, who published a tweet about the work.

A recording of the earlier performances of Manifest Destiny was screened in a room in the Houses of Parliament on 25 June 2025.

An orchestrated version of Manifest Destiny 2011 (for single woodwind, horn and trumpet with strings) was given its premiere at St John's Church, Waterloo on 15 November 2025.

== List of works ==
=== Performed works ===
- Songs For Olivier (settings of Baudelaire poems for piano and voice) – premiered by Olivier Ferrer at the Institute of Contemporary Arts, London, 1988.
- Kirsty’s Dream (for two violins and piano) – premiered by The Grosvenor Group at the Institute of Contemporary Arts, London, 1988.
- Clarinet Sonata (for clarinet and piano) – premiered by Andrew Sparling at the University of Essex, 1990.
- Violin & Piano Sonata – premiered by The Grosvenor Group (funding by Westminster Arts Council) at Westminster Cathedral Hall, 1990.
- Piano Quartet No. 1 – premiered by The Grosvenor Group (funding by Westminster Arts Council) at Westminster Cathedral Hall, 1990.
- Songs of Love & Remembrance (sixteen songs for soprano/alto/tenor/bass soloists with ensemble of string quintet, two flutes, clarinet and harp) – premiered by the Grosvenor Group at the Burrell Collection, Glasgow, 1990 (also performed by the Burstein Ensemble at the Purcell Room, London, 1993).
- Piano Preludes – premiered and performed by composer (venue unspecified), 1990.
- String Quartet Study – premiered by the Grosvenor Group at Westminster Cathedral Hall, London, 1990.
- Heaven’s Embroidered Cloth (for soprano/alto/tenor/bass soloists, string quintet, two flutes, clarinet and harp) – commissioned by Maria Vasconcellos and premiered by the Grosvenor Group at St Bride's Church, London, 1991. This is an excerpt from Marchioness Requiem (see Unperformed works).
- Hymns Of Benediction (for choir and organ) – premiered at St Bride's Church, London, 1991.
- Piano Quartet No. 2 – premiered by Marc Choi (commissioned by Durston House School), 1991.
- Eternal City (for 26-piece brass ensemble) – premiered by the BT Brass Band at the Design Museum, London, 1991.
- Lullaby For Stephen (for cor anglais, harp and piano) – premiered by Danielle Perrett and others live on Classic FM radio, 1993.
- Glittering Horizon (piano sonata) – premiered and performed by composer at the Conway Hall, London, 1994.
- Prayer For Peace (for soprano/alto/tenor/bass soloists, string quintet, two flutes, clarinet and harp) – premiered by the Burstein Ensemble at St James Garlickhythe Church, London, 1994.
- Leavetaking (for 26-piece brass ensemble) – premiered by the BT Brass Band at Southwark Cathedral, 1994.
- A Live Flame (In memoriam John Smith MP) (for orchestra and tenor) – premiered by London Musici (conducted by Richard Coxon) at St John's, Smith Square, London, 1995.
- Missa Brevis (for unaccompanied choir) – commissioned by Norwich Cathedral (commission split with Arvo Pärt) and premiered at Norwich Cathedral (alongside the Pärt composition I Am The True Vine), 1996.
- The Gates Of Time (for chamber orchestra, choir and soprano soloist) – commissioned by The Thomas Tallis Society of Greenwich to mark the Millennium and premiered at St Alfege Church, Greenwich, London, October 1999.
- Alfege (for orchestra and choir plus soprano/tenor/bass soloists) – commissioned by The Thomas Tallis Society to mark The Millennium, and premiered at St Alfege Church, Greenwich, London, 2000.
- The Year's Midnight – A Meditation on The Holocaust (for chamber orchestra, choir, and tenor/soprano/mezzo-soprano soloists) – commissioned and performed by the Zemel Choir plus orchestra at St John's, Smith Square, London, 2000 (broadcast premiere on BBC Radio 4 Holocaust Memorial Day 2001).
- Songs Against War (for mezzo-soprano soloist and piano; settings of poems by Keith Douglas, Wilfred Owen, Lemn Sissay and Ben Okri) – premiered at Cockpit Theatre, London, October 2001.
- String Quartet no. 1: Dance Of Death/Dream Of Love – premiered and commissioned by the Bochmann String Quartet (funded by the Jewish Music Institute) at the Bridewell Theatre, London, March 2002.
- Manifest Destiny (opera, libretto by Dic Edwards) – first act premiered at Cockpit Theatre, London, 2003: subsequent full productions at Tricycle Theatre, London, 2004 and 2005 Edinburgh Festival Fringe.
- Symphony (Elixir) (for orchestra) – performed by the Southbank Sinfonia in 2009 and by Kaunas City Symphony Orchestra in 2012
- Manifest Destiny 2011 (opera, libretto by Burstein and Dic Edwards) – extensively rewritten version of Manifest Destiny premiered at the King's Head Theatre, London, September 2011.
- Songs of Love & Solitude (for mezzo-soprana and orchestra) – performed by Rita Novikaite and Kaunas City Symphony Orchestra in 2012

=== Recorded works ===
- Three Preludes (for solo piano), part of 'Four Seasons Singles Club: Autumn' release on Day Release Records (2001)
- Symphony 'Elixir' – Songs of Love & Solitude, Kaunas City Symphony Orchestra/Keith Burstein/Rita Novikaite, Naxos, 9.70167 (2013)

=== Unperformed works ===
- Chamber Symphony, 1989
- Piano Study, 1991
- Marchioness Requiem (for symphony orchestra, large chorus and soprano/alto/tenor/bass soloists), 1990–1993 – commissioned by Maria Vasconcellos in memory of her sons Antonio and Domingos who died in the Marchioness disaster. Part of this work, Heaven’s Embroidered Cloth, was performed in 1991 (see Performed works).
- Diasanon Arrives (for symphony orchestra), 1997
- The Same Love (for mezzo-soprano soloist), 2000
- The Ship Of Death (for male vocal quartet – originally written for the Hilliard Ensemble), 2003
- Piano Sonata No. 2 (Perpetually Descending Veils Through Blazes Of Light), 2009 (currently awaiting performance)

=== Uncompleted works ===
- The Furthering (opera)
