= Manifest Destiny 2011 =

Manifest Destiny 2011 is a British opera composed by Keith Burstein with a libretto by Burstein and Dic Edwards. It is a revision of Burstein and Edwards' previous 2003 opera Manifest Destiny and maintains its predecessor's subject matter of Islamic suicide bombers, the ramifications of both the Middle Eastern conflict and the war on terror.

Set in the present day or "near-future", the complex plot centres on a harrowing journey through the war on terror by the Palestinian political activists Leila and Mohammed and Leila's lover Daniel (a Jewish composer). At one time potential suicide bombers, Leila and Mohammed renounce violence and attempt to resolve their lives and grievances in a more peaceful manner, but are caught up in the brutal realpolitik of war and the imperial machinations of the American state. The action takes place variously in London, Palestine, Afghanistan, the White House in Washington, D.C., and Camp X-Ray (Guantanamo), and contains both realistic and metaphysical content.

To date, the opera has been staged in a run of nine performances in the quartet version, at the King's Head Theatre in London in September 2011, and in a version for small orchestra has been given a one-off performance at St John's Church, Waterloo in November 2025.

== Subject matter ==
Set in the present day or "near-future", the complex plot centres on a harrowing journey through the war on terror by the Palestinian poet Leila who, along with her friend Mohammed, is radicalised and drawn into a suicide bomber cell, leaving her lover (the Jewish composer Daniel) in a state of hysterical blindness due to his despair at her loss and at the state of the world. Leila and Mohammed subsequently undergo a profound change of heart, renouncing violence and rejecting their own bombs. However, their attempts to achieve a more peaceful resolution to their lives (in the face of a brutal and cynical war campaign involving the President of the United States of America and her Director of CIA) result in them becoming further, and fatally, entangled in the conflict when Mohammed takes the fatal step of "saving" Leila by turning her over to American forces, leading to her internment and subsequent death in Camp X-Ray. Mohammed retrieves the dead Leila's poetry as a completed libretto, which he brings back to Daniel to set to music (effecting a symbolic reconciliation between Jewish and Palestinian cultures). The two (joined by the goddess Theia) embark on a new mission of hope and harmony.

== Background and performance history ==
Following the original productions of Manifest Destiny in 2003 and 2005, Burstein developed plans to stage a revival to coincide with the tenth anniversary of the 9/11 terror attacks. He approached the London-based opera company OperaUpClose, who were known for their innovative low-budget stagings of classic operas as well as an interest in new or rare works. Working in collaboration with director Valentina Ceschi, Burstein revised the opera for the occasion. He himself provided a new quartet orchestration and additional music and also extensively rewrote the libretto, resulting in a significantly different work, which he retitled Manifest Destiny 2011.

Manifest Destiny 2011 ran for nine performances (including four previews and a press night), opening on 11 September 2011, at the King's Head Theatre, London, and continuing as part of the OperaUpClose repertoire during the same month.

A recording of the earlier performances was screened in a room in the Houses of Parliament on 25 June 2025.

An orchestrated version (for single woodwind, horn and trumpet with strings) was performed at St John's Church, Waterloo on 15 November 2025.

=== Changes from original Manifest Destiny ===
The most prominent revisions in Manifest Destiny 2011 were in the libretto, which underwent significant changes. It now drew on fresh developments in contemporary world history including the then-contemporaneous "Arab Spring" and the growing profile of Sarah Palin (who at the time was a potential Presidential candidate). The characters of "Mrs President" and "Director of CIA" kept their original roles and functions but also acquired names – "Hillary" and "Carlos Masueda", with the former being portrayed onstage as a character similar to Sarah Palin and with elements of Hillary Clinton. Three of the supporting characters from the original opera were removed: the suicide bomber Omah, the Afghanistan-based CIA Man and the Jailer in Guantanamo. The latter two roles and their sung material were conflated into the role of Carlos Masueda.

Within the opera's fictional framework, the notorious "suicide bomb-robing" scene from the original opera was removed entirely. An increased emphasis on metaphysical content was added (including references to Gaia theory) and the goddess Theia appeared as a character in the finale. Burstein remarked that the overall approach of the opera had now shifted to emphasize the concept of the power of love overcoming violence. He has also suggested that Manifest Destiny 2011 is now intended to be the first in a trilogy cycle of operas, which he has referred to at various times as "Revolution X" and "The Flame".

Burstein also wrote new musical material for the revised work – most notably overtures for both acts and a new finale.

== Critical response ==
As had been the case with the original version of the opera, Manifest Destiny 2011 received mixed reviews. While the set design and staging concept was well received and the singers were generally praised for their performances, the music, libretto and plot were greeted with both positive and negative responses.

In classical music web magazine Bachtrack, Katy S. Austin praised the score for its "ravishing harmonies and tense orchestration" and commented "The ensemble – Violin, Viola, Clarinet and Cello –brought out the powerful depths of Keith Burstein's score with the dignity and sensitivity it deserves".

Broadway World wrote "Manifest Destiny 2011 is a powerful and ambitious work"

Archant North London wrote "Manifest Destiny 2011 is a revival and slight reworking of Keith Burstein's operatic hit from the 2005 Edinburgh Fringe Festival."

For The Good Review Christina Folkard wrote of Manifest Destiny 2011 that "It has been reworked, re-produced and reincarnated into a powerfully raw story of love and politics."

Yet Rupert Christiansen of The Daily Telegraph attacked the music as "gloopy and lachrymose" and "sophomoric" (as well as making a disparaging comparison to the music of Ravel). For Time Out, Hannah Nepil asserted that the score "lacks bite". In London 24, David Ladds hailed the score as "surprisingly pleasant and generally well-played" while in Fringe Review Mark Brown commented that "the songs, whilst pleasant and at times emotional, do suffer from being a bit one note."

Christina Folkard for The Good Review commented there were "some very beautiful moments. There's always a wonderful experience to be had at London's Little Opera House, and I suggest you don't miss Manifest Destiny 2011."

In Time Out, Jonathan Rennie wrote "The music sits between late romanticism and Philip Glass. It is so lyrical" while in The Stage, Graham Rogers criticised the music's "treacly neo-English pastoral style (and) occasional incongruous and mystifying departures into Latin American tango" and its perceived lack of variety, concluding that it would "inevitably pall". In Spoonfed, Naima Khan opined that the music "is unambitious and feels familiar, but paired with this highly political content it's a testament to the potential of the art form", while allowing that the part of Leila was "vocally stunning. Her lines are the most poetic and an example of what opera can do that a straight play can't."

In Culture Wars, Paul Kilbey criticized the score in the context of Burstein's much-publicised stance against the dominance of atonal music, commenting "to tackle this, Burstein writes extremely benign music with lots of major and minor chords. Much like the opera's politics, this idea misses the mark in terms of polemic: 'atonalism' could benefit from a more precise definition than Burstein gives it, and besides, by normal standards, there are plenty of contemporary composers who make heavy and inventive use of tonality. And while Burstein's music remains extreme for just how diatonic it is, this unfortunately doesn't make it interesting or original."

Yet for Bachtrack, Katy S. Austin concluded "There are some very touching moments, [and indeed performances], in Manifest Destiny 2011. It improves as it progresses too, leaving the most spellbinding atmosphere of desperation until the final Act."

Regarding the opera in general, Gary Naylor of West End/Broadway World hailed it as "a powerful and ambitious work... an hour and a half of an intense combination of music and drama that exhausts and rewards in equal measure" and noted that the work "addresses the question of whether art can be more powerful than violence in advancing a political cause, or whether art must always be hitched to violence to find the authority it needs in these troubled times." In The Daily Telegraph Christiansen dismissed the opera as "a hopeless non-starter... The drama is all bleeding-heart pleas for love and understanding... wretchedly dreary and banal."

Yet in contrast Christina Folkard in The Good Review stated that "The libretto is raw, honest and often very uncomfortable, but that was the point."

However, in The Stage Rogers expressed disappointment: "There are many examples of how opera can be a successful forum for challenging thought on complex and highly-charged subject matters such as this but, with its simplistic views and resolutely unchallenging score, Manifest Destiny is not among them. Relatively short by operatic standards, this is still an arduous experience."

The following however appeared in Time Out: "The composer Keith Burstein and librettist Dic Edwards have taken the traditional Romeo and Juliet tragic love story and set it in contemporary war torn Arabia, creating a moving and shocking piece re-evaluating the enduring belief that love conquers all", and further commented that "celebrating the idea of love and how powerful it can be is bold and brave".

In the London24 review, Ladd found fault with the "somewhat one-dimensional characters" and complained of an over-simplistic story, but conceded "if you are willing to look beyond the narrative nonsense, those with an open mind and an appetite for something a little different might find it an enjoyable distraction." In Fringe Review, Brown complained that in spite of the tragic-opera hallmarks of the story, "the plotting is such that it is almost impossible to understand what is going on. The narrative takes massive leaps from plot point to point without giving the audience much indication what might have occurred in between these jumps." However, he conceded that the staging and symbolism did much to compensate for that, and praised the "striking imagery... evocative atmosphere and good performances that save this piece from being an incoherent trudge through clichés from the last decade." and further commented that "Opera Manifest Destiny provides striking imagery, strong performances and a positive message. The effective use of onstage camera projection onto a large screen (also cleverly hiding the quartet) provides a sense of grandeur not usually seen on the meager Kings Head stage, while the flower strewn stage sends out ambiguous messages of life, death and rebirth. Funereal yet hopeful…."

For Bachtrack, Austin was less impressed with the opera's libretto than she had been with the score, labelling the former "raw and clunky, even cartoonish" and pointing out that "(the) clumsy libretto and the unhappy bedfellows of farce and human conflict drama... ultimately leave the audience wondering whether to indulge in satirical laughter at the villains of the piece or feel ashamed in sympathy with their young, feisty victims." For Time Out, Nepil commented that the opera "runs like a well-oiled machine" but also that it "could have hit so much harder", and she dismissed the libretto as "clunky and relentlessly un-operatic." She also argued that the opera's treatment of its themes were "too cloying for comfort: simplistic and often contrived, this loose variation on the traditional Romeo & Juliet story trumpets the redemptive power of love. It's a theme that can work well, but here the delivery is toe-curlingly saccharine, right down to the flower-bedecked stage.".

Khan commented in Spoonfed that "though the opera itself is obscure on a few too many occasions, Manifest Destiny is a curious look at the mindset of each player in an endless game of manipulation... Definitely food for thought... a contemplative, sometimes blurry look at the global response to American foreign policy, a blurry topic in itself." She also found some fault with the romantic component: "Disappointingly, in exploring the reaction to 9/11 and how culpable America is in the tragedy, Manifest Destiny 2011 tries to weave in multiple love stories and we see Leila's accomplice give up his violent mission to save her from certain death. Even her interrogator falls for her... But allowing Leila's relationships to become the driving force of this play does it an injustice. Instead of rooting the politics in human emotion, it trivialises them. These relationships hamper the clarity of what writer Keith Burstein addresses and provide a lot of confusion... It is clear however, that she's in conflict with herself, something the libretto addresses beautifully."

While praising the level of commitment within the production, Culture Wars queried the feasibility of the central love affair between an Islamist and a Jew. Kilbey's review also queried the clarity of the opera's plot and moral stance – "We are asked to sympathise with the plight of Leila's homeland... but we are not shown how this plight might lead to a justification for becoming a suicide bomber. The suicide bombers, in fact, are only humanised because the question of why they became suicide bombers is never properly examined (and also because neither of them actually go through with the act). In short, the plot of this opera is quite odd and far less constructively polemical than it intends."

Kilbey also compared the work unfavourably to two other contemporary "polemical operas" (Mieczysław Weinberg's The Passenger and John Adams' The Death of Klinghoffer) asserting that "where both (these) differ from Manifest Destiny, however, is in their sensitivity and technical accomplishment, and perhaps the key issue which the production raises is precisely when it is actually worth engaging with controversy. [...] whether it is particularly constructive – or indeed sensitive – to tackle issues as meaty as suicide bombing if you're not going to say anything useful about them."

While in contrast, Katy S. Austin for Bachtrack review site wrote of Manifest Destiny 2011 that "Music and politics combine to form a potent mix. Art in its exclusive pursuit, can arguably avoid making a political statement;but it can also shine a bitingly harsh light on political themes, thus bringing them close to home through acts of personal dramatisation. Manifest Destiny 2011 proudly does the latter".

== Roles ==
Roles, voice types, premiere cast
Role
Voice type	Premiere cast, 11 September 2011 Conductor: Keith Burstein	
Leila (Palestinian émigré and poet, would-be suicide bomber)	soprano	Emma Pettemerides
Daniel Xavier (Anglo-Jewish composer)	tenor	David Menzes
Mohammed (Palestinian political activist and would-be suicide bomber)	baritone	Dario Dugandzic
Mrs President Hillary (newly-elected President of the USA)	soprano	Katrina Waters
Carlos Masueda, Director of CIA (American government official)	baritone	Tom Kennedy
Theia (supernatural being)	soprano	Emma Pettemerides

The roles of Leila and Theia are doubled by the same singer.

== Synopsis ==
The action takes place in London, Palestine, Afghanistan, the White House in Washington, D.C., and Camp X-Ray, Guantanamo Bay.

=== Act 1 ===
Scene 1 – London

The Palestinian poet Leila and the British Jewish composer Daniel are living together as partners in London, with Leila writing a libretto for Daniel's music. However, all is not well. Daniel is gradually going blind, and considers his condition to be a response to the trauma of world events. These are now dominated by a seemingly unavoidable clash between the West and the retaliatory terrorism of the third world, which perceives its spiritual values as under threat. (Aria: "O Israel".) Leila is also affected. What she sees as the iniquities of the post-9/11 world and the growing "war on terror" have pushed her into pro-Palestinian political activism. She has now decided to pursue of martyrdom as part of her personal jihad.

Torn between her love for Daniel and her loyalty to Palestine, Leila chooses to leave Daniel and return to the Middle East to join a cell of Islamic suicide bombers. (Duet: "You've been crying".) Daniel attempts to persuade her otherwise but she is adamant (Duet: "Revenge is futile") and after a harrowing debate, the two part (Duet: "Now is the beginning of my world, my night"). As Daniel plunges into despair, his blindness takes hold. (Aria: "These?") His sense of responsibility intensifies, but his ability to act is paralyzed by his loss of Leila, whose unfinished poem on the struggle for freedom and justice was his inspiration.

Scene 2 – Palestine

Leila has joined her friend Mohammed in the suicide bomb cell. Expecting to be sent out on a suicide mission, she is surprised when Mohammed reveals that he has fallen in love with her. (Song: "Not yet, Leila, not yet".) Inspired by Leila's power of creativity (which he considers to be a greater power than that of violence) he now believes that her poetic vision, not her power to kill, is her true duty to Islam. Having sabotaged the cell's bomb supply (thus ending their mission as terrorists) he attempts to dissuade her from her chosen course.

Leila realises that she has confused her passion for the cause with her friendship with Mohammed, and that she is still in love with Daniel. (Duet: "I am confused – my passion is to fight".) Rejecting Mohammed, Leila leaves, choosing to pursue her own jihad further afield in Afghanistan. Left alone, Mohammed reasserts that his love of Leila is more powerful than his commitment to martyrdom. (Aria: "This pain is too real – greater than all the grief of Islam"). In a growing state of enlightenment, he completes the rejection of his previous violent course and draws on a new interpretation of his own Islamic beliefs to foresee a non-violent way forward, including peace tolerance and harmony. Unsure of Leila's ability to follow the same course, he decides that he must save her from herself ("for Islam and for Man") and follows her to Afghanistan.

=== Act 2 ===
Scene 1 – The White House, Washington, D.C.

In the Oval Office of the White House, the newly elected US President is seen celebrating with CIA Director Carlos Masueda after the President's Inaugural Ball. (Duet: "The Oval Office!") They muse idly and flippantly about their growing global ambitions. (Duet: "So where do we begin, Mrs President?") during which Masueda reveals his aims of manipulating the Middle East and they imply that Masueda himself was involved in staging the 9/11 attacks. Masueda tempts the President by telling her that she can become "the first American Emperor".

Scene 2 – Afghanistan/London

In parallel scenes, Daniel (in London) and Leila (in Afghanistan) call out to the memory of each other. (Aria: "So cold on this mountain top" and duet: "Oh Daniel!") Meanwhile, Mohammed (who has successfully followed Leila to Afghanistan) is captured by American forces. Masueda, who has flown out there to supervise operations, interrogates and beats him, but the newly pacific Mohammed embraces his torturer and pledges loyalty.

Leila recalls how European Americans destroyed the Native Americans for the sake of gold with their manifest destiny policy, and fears that a similar fate awaits the Arabs for the sake of their oil. (Aria: "For a century Western nations have brought terror to Arabia") She pleads that the Arabs only want to live in "the beauty of their beliefs". In their separate worlds, Daniel, Leila, Mohammed and Masueda muse on the situation (Quartet: "Parallels").

Mohammed decides to betray Leila to the US forces (Duet: "I can give you a leading terrorist"). Privately, he reasons that if she is imprisoned it will save her life and that, if she is still intending to be a suicide bomber, it will ensure that she cannot kill others. However, the decision causes him anguish and doubt (Aria: "To be blind...") In London, Daniel sings of his continuing faith in Leila (Aria: "Leila, redeemer of my memory").

The final image of Act 2 is of Leila pinned in the beam of a helicopter searchlight as she is captured by American forces.

=== Act 3 ===
Scene 1 – The White House, Washington, D.C.

With Masueda's return to America, a moral struggle develops between him and the President. In a display of conscience, she expresses misgivings about attacking Arabian states, and fears "as a mother" for "the children of Arabia". (Duet: "I feel so uncertain") Masueda explains the situation (Duet: "Mrs President – the Arabians have oil"). He states that "these resources belong to the world" and that America, on behalf of the world, must "rescue" those resources. He sweeps aside the President's protests, claiming "the conflict will last beyond your term of office", and insists that she signs the authorization for war.

As she signs, they are interrupted by the sudden arrival of Mohammed, who has convinced his captors of his value as a double agent. (Trio: "Mrs P, meet Mohammed!") He is duly dispatched to Guantanamo Bay by his new American masters, who believe that he is a "big catch" who will extract secrets from the detainees there. Carried away by the moment, Masueda announces that the new Manifest Destiny now applies to everyone ("even the bums on our campuses!") and that this is the beginning of "full spectrum dominance – pre-emptive strikes against everyone".

Left alone, Mohammed reveals his true motive. Following Leila's capture and imprisonment, he simply wishes to follow her to Guantanamo to seek forgiveness for his betrayal of her, and redemption for his actions. (Aria: "When I betrayed Leila")

Scene 2 – Camp X-Ray, Guantanamo Bay (Leila's cell)

Masueda travels to Guantanamo – in advance of Mohammed – to continue Leila's interrogation in which he beats and mocks her (Duet: "What is this? It's not poetry.") Her spirit all but broken, Leila pleas for an end to her suffering (Aria: "Let me die"). Despite himself, Masueda is moved to a kind of remorse. Declaring "no, I will save you" he unbinds her and goes in search of water. Left alone, Leila sings of how war has despoiled her homeland and its people (Aria: "There is a tree in my mother's garden").

Masueda returns to wash Leila's feet. He assures her that she and her people will be safe once their country has been conquered and restructured to American standards. (Aria: "We are not here to hurt you"). However, Leila's journey through idealism, rage, capture, torment and imprisonment has been too much for her. She announces "when this is over, I'll be dead".

Scene 3 – Camp X-Ray, Guantanamo Bay (a waiting room)

Several days later, Mohammed arrives on his mission from the White House. He waits patiently to see Leila, and daydreams of forgiveness and a new life for them in America (Aria: "Waiting in this room"). Masueda comes to the waiting room to meet him, and Mohammed announces that he has come for Leila (Duet: "Are you Mohammed"). Masueda reveals that Mohammed is too late. Leila has killed herself, having hanged herself in her cell. The grief-stricken Mohammed demands Leila's manuscript (Duet: "No, Death's breathing is her life") and Masueda gives it to him. Mohammed departs with the manuscript.

Scene 4 – London

Outside Daniel's London studio, dawn has arrived. As the sun rises, little by little Daniel's sight miraculously returns. (Aria: "Today the light comes dripping like a honey'd thread") He is overjoyed, although he wonders why this has happened with Leila still not returned and "the world not mended yet".

In the flood of brilliant light, Mohammed arrives from Guantanamo. He hands the apprehensive Daniel Leila's libretto (Duet: "My name is Mohammed"). On the front, Daniel reads the words "Manifest Destiny". Mohammed reasserts that it is now Daniel's mission to set her words to music. At this point, a mysterious veiled woman appears. This is Theia, who describes herself as "a friend" and reveals that all three of them now have work to do, creating a work of art and harmony that will help to heal the world. All three leave together, with the final outcome unresolved.

== Content ==
=== Musical elements ===
The opera is a through-sung music drama. The music is tonal in nature, in common with the body of Burstein's music, also incorporating sardonic waltzes, tangos and echoes of American marching tunes during the sections involving American characters and scenes. The music was orchestrated for a quartet of two violins, cello and clarinet, and was conducted by Burstein himself in the original production; the version for small orchestra features single woodwind, horn and trumpet with strings, and also was conducted by Burstein himself.

=== Political content (and critical response to same) ===
The tone of Manifest Destiny 2011's libretto is forthright, reflecting Burstein and Edwards' view of the state of current world affairs. Its sympathies are clearly with its less materially empowered characters – the two Palestinians Leila and Mohammed, and the British Jew Daniel. In Bachtrack, Katy S. Austin noted the opera's "extreme political left-wing" position in which "the CIA and USA are continually portrayed as stupid, greedy and treacherous whilst the Middle Eastern characters are romanticised as spiritual and ideological warriors." Compared to the spiritual journeys and declarations of the other characters, both of the American characters are presented negatively. The President herself is deeply morally compromised – asking questions about the ethics of situations but generally not comprehending or caring about the consequences (despite a fleeting attack of conscience in the third act), and apparently being already involved in war crimes and cover-ups. The CIA Director Carlos Masueda is portrayed as a brutal Machiavellian committed to the concept of the New American Century and using a mixture of temptation, moral seduction and bullying to achieve his ends, citing protection of the world's oil supplies as his moral justification. He also personally oversees the interrogation and brutalisation of both Mohammed and Leila, although his encounter with Leila appears to have left him changed and regretful.

Several of the more politically controversial elements of the original Manifest Destiny were either removed from the new opera or given less prominence. The suicide bomb robing scene from Act 2 (with all of its sung rhetoric and dramatic implications) was removed entirely; as was the character of Omah (the only one of the original three Palestinians who maintained his hardline stance and carried out his terrorist suicide bomb mission without any reconsideration). The original threats of actual and symbolic rape made to the captured Mohammed by a representative of the CIA were also removed. The opera's final scene – that of a Palestinian Arab and a Jew, both injured by politics and warfare, reconciling in forgiveness – was replaced by one in which the two were joined by a goddess and embarked on a metaphysical mission of world healing. However, additions were made to the first White House scene which strongly implied that the CIA and elements of the American political class (including, within the opera, Maseuda and the new President) had staged the 9/11 attacks for political gain. The scenes set in Camp X-Ray (which, when originally written in 2002–3, predicted the Abu Ghraib prisoner abuses at least a year before they occurred in real life) were retained.

The opera's political content did not go unnoticed (or unchallenged) by reviewers. Gary Naylor of West End/Broadway World commented that the American characters had stepped "straight from the pages of a James Gillray caricature catalogue to satisfy every prejudice of a cookie-cutter anti-American European" in comparison to the presentation of other characters as "sensitive, rounded, if ultimately doomed, individuals". In the London24 review, David Ladd considered that the opera "(fell) far short of its billing as an 'explosive new opera [that] examines America's culpability for the horrific attacks'. Don't go expecting to be challenged in any way." Conversely Christina Folkard of The Good Review praised the opera as "a powerfully raw story of love and politics... (which) poses many questions about terrorism and the consequences of war." In addition to her comments on the political stance of Manifest Destiny 2011 in Bachtrack, Katy S. Austin suggested that the themes of the opera had become less controversial since its original treatment in 2003. However, she concluded "the subject matter is still poignant and sometimes ubiquitous. People abuse less powerful people, the motives behind Western intervention in Arab countries are questioned, races and even lovers struggle to triumph over deep-seated ideological differences."

=== Dramatic elements and staging ===
As with Manifest Destiny, the opera utilizes a wide variety of theatrical techniques and approaches including tragedy, black comedy, satire, sections which can be played as dream sequences, agitprop, expressionism, and parallel scenes. Dramatic and metaphorical themes include revenge, terrorism (and its definitions), blindness, redemption through love, pacifism and imperialism.

The staging for the Opera Up Close production was minimal (mostly using moveable blocks of plastic flowers within a black box stage), and featured extensive use of camcorders and live image projection.

== Recordings ==
Although performance recordings of the original production (both audio and video) exist, Manifest Destiny 2011 has not yet been recorded for professional release.
