= Vera Veljkov-Medaković =

Serbian pianist (1923–2011)

Vera Veljkov
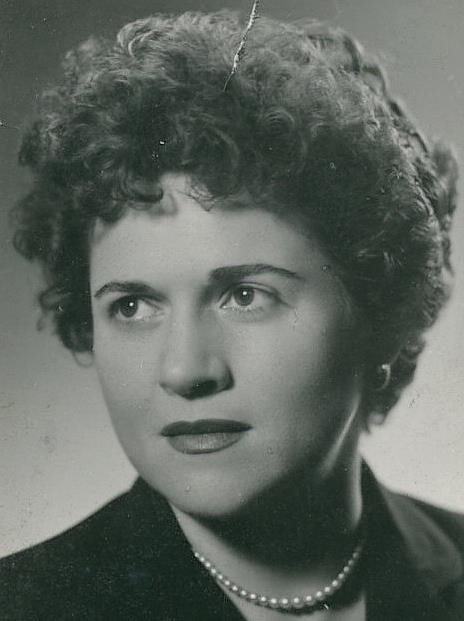
- Pianist and piano teacher

Background information
- Born: Vera Veljkov; July 18, 1923; Bavaniste, Serbia, Yugoslavia
- Died: September 29, 2011 (aged 88) Belgrade, Serbia
- Genres: Classical
- Occupations: Pedagogue, Pianist
- Instrument: Piano

Vera Veljkov-Medaković (Serbian Cyrillic: Вера Вељков-Медаковић) (July 18, 1923 – September 29, 2011) was a Serbian pianist and piano teacher.

== Education ==
Veljkov studied at the elementary and secondary music school "Stanković" in Belgrade. Her teacher, Rikard Schwartz, dedicated his Children's Suite for Piano to her when she was twelve. She graduated with honors. After she finished high school, she studied the piano at the Belgrade Music Academy piano department under prof. Emil Hayek, graduating with the highest marks in 1942.

As one of the most promising students of the Belgrade Music Academy, she traveled to Paris in 1947 for training. She studied the piano at the Conservatoire de Paris with Lazare Lévy for a period of two years, and then another year with Marguerite Long, where visiting "Les cours pour les Francais et Etrangers virtuoses". She later returned to Belgrade with a degree from the Paris Conservatory, she continued her work at the Music Academy, where she remained until her retirement in 1984. At the Music Academy (FMA), she underwent re-election in all vocations, from assistant to full professor, and at one time performed and served as chief of the Department of piano at the Faculty of Music.

== Musical career ==
Her first solo concert was on April 8, 1943 at the Kolarac National University of Belgrade. Since her return from Paris in 1950, she performed in twenty four different piano recitals, including programs with Serbian composers such as Biserka Cvejic, a soloist in Vienna and Munich, with the works of S. Rajičić, P. Milosevic, M. Tajcevic, V. Peričić, D. Kostic and D. Radic. With various orchestras in the country and abroad, she performed as a soloist in multiple venues, including Beethoven in G major, Mozart concerto for piano and orchestra in b minor, KV491, Liszt Concerto for Piano and Orchestra in E flat major and Ravel Concerto for Piano and Concerto in G major.

She recorded for radio and television broadcasts beginning in 1945, including the TV show Family Notes with the Symphony Orchestra of RTB, and recorded a total of 23 shows for radio and three television programs. She recorded six shows for Radio Dubrovnik as well as works of Serbian composers for Vienna Radio. As an accompanist she has performed in radio shows with soloists Vera Sušnjak faith-Vojnović, Rose Arbanas, Olga Vukmirovic and Biserka Cvejic, with the program of Serbian, German, American, French and Spanish composers, as well as black and American Indian songs for voice and piano.

In October 1983, she performed in a concert in Novi Sad honoring the work of Petar Konjović.

She performed as a soloist in Austria, Germany, France, Romania and all the centers of the former Yugoslavia.

== Personal life ==
Veljkov married academician Dejan Medaković.
