= Manifest Destiny (opera) =

2004 opera by Keith Burstein and Dic Edwards

- Opera by Keith Burstein
- Librettist: Dic Edwards
- Language: English
- Based on: Middle Eastern conflict
- Premiere: 2004; Tricycle Theatre, London

Manifest Destiny is an opera composed by Keith Burstein with an English libretto by Dic Edwards. The opera is notable for dealing with the subject of Islamic suicide bombers, and with the ramifications of both the Middle Eastern conflict and the war on terror.

Set in the present day or "near-future", the complex plot centres on a harrowing journey through the war on terror by the Palestinian poet Leila who—along with her friend Mohammed—is radicalised and drawn into a suicide bomber cell, leaving her lover (the Jewish composer Daniel) in a state of hysterical blindness due to his despair at her loss and at the state of the world. Leila and Mohammed subsequently undergo a profound change of heart and, on the eve of their suicide mission, renounce violence and reject their own bombs. However, their attempts to achieve a more peaceful resolution to their lives (in the face of a brutal and cynical war campaign involving the President of the United States of America and her Director of CIA) result in them becoming further—and fatally—entangled in the conflict when Mohammed takes the fatal step of "saving" Leila by turning her over to American forces, leading to her internment and subsequent death in Camp X-Ray. The plot is resolved when Mohammed retrieves the dead Leila's poetry as a completed libretto, which he brings back to Daniel to set to music (effecting a symbolic reconciliation between Jewish and Palestinian cultures in spite of realpolitik interests and personal tragedy).

Manifest Destiny has attracted a large amount of press attention due to its themes, content and subject matter—including scenes showing the preparations for a suicide bomb raid and the incarceration and maltreatment of Leila in Camp X-Ray (the latter of which was a scene written prior to public knowledge of the events at Abu Ghraib). An accusation in the press was the subject of a libel action (Burstein vs Associated Newspapers) in the British High Court.

The opera has been staged twice: once at London's Tricycle Theatre in 2004 and once at the Edinburgh Fringe Festival in 2005.

Six years after the Edinburgh performances, the opera was extensively rewritten and restaged in London as Manifest Destiny 2011; a further revised, orchestrated version (for single woodwind, horn and trumpet with strings) was performed at St John's Church, Waterloo on 15 November 2025.

== Composition and inspiration ==
Seeking collaborators for an opera taking the "war on terror" as its subject, Burstein advertised for a librettist. He advertised for a librettist via Artists Against The War. In late 2002, the post was filled by controversial Welsh playwright Dic Edwards, and the two subsequently wrote Manifest Destiny together, completing the opera in 2003. Though critical in tone, the opera was explicitly presented as a pacifist statement. Both Burstein and Edwards took pains to stress that the opera did not endorse the actions of suicide bombers and displayed them ultimately rejecting their violent course of action. In the programme for the Edinburgh production, Burstein wrote: "The renunciation of violence in time of war will always seem miraculous. Manifest Destiny is an attempt to describe such a miracle. Taking as its starting point the most ardent form of contemporary violence—that of the suicide bomber—it asks us to contemplate a path, a journey of the soul, on which these 'martyrs' are transformed by the power of love. Their grievances remain, their passionate demand for justice remains, but their weapon turns from war to peace."

In interviews with Reuters, Edwards has stated "I've always believed theatre is a place of debate... What we wanted to show is that terrorists are human beings, with the same emotions as the rest of us. While it's impossible to sympathise with terrorism, I think we have to, for the sake of the future, try and understand it... We wanted to show that potentially we are all suicide bombers if there is a cause." Burstein added "Opera is peculiarly able to X-ray issues and X-ray the soul in a way that other media do not.I hope the opera will surprise people by making the characters in this story seem to be very immediate and very real. ... There is also a symbol at the end of a possible reconciliation between Palestinians and Jews."

In an article written for The Scotsman, Burstein stated"(Manifest Destiny) imagines a scenario in which the protagonists – would-be suicide bombers – are stopped in their tracks. Not by the security services, but by their own humanity: a process of love, springing from within the peaceful teachings of Islam and triumphing over their anger and fear. In the near-future envisaged in the opera, it is Mohammed, a Jihadist committed to violent direct action, who is transformed by discovering the human-scaled, yet overwhelming nature of his love for a fellow suicide bomber (which) has so overwhelmed his emotions that he can neither let her die, nor let her or himself kill others."

== Performance history ==
A promenade production of the first act of Manifest Destiny was performed at the Cockpit Theatre, Marylebone, London during November 2003, directed by David Wybrow. The first full-length production was subsequently performed at the Tricycle Theatre, Kilburn, London on 27 June 2004 (produced by Corin Redgrave).

The second full-length production (also directed by David Wybrow) was staged at the St Georges West venue between 6 and 29 August 2005 as part of the 2005 Edinburgh Festival Fringe, with a cast of four. The Observer announced it as "undoubtedly the most controversial production" of the festival," and it was flagged by both The Independent and The Times as one of the five top classical music events to see in Edinburgh that year. Excerpts from the opera were subsequently performed at public concerts – notably, part of the Guantanamo Bay prison scene from Act 3.

Member of Parliament John McDonnell arranged to host a screening of these performances in a room in the Houses of Parliament on 25 June 2025.

== Critical response ==
The critical response to Manifest Destiny was widely varied. The various productions gained a great deal of press attention, much of it relating to the subject matter, including coverage by Reuters, the BBC and Süddeutsche Zeitung.

=== Tricycle Theatre, 2003 ===
For the 2003 Tricycle Theatre production, The Observer's Anthony Holden described Manifest Destiny as a "worthy piece" but also commented that "for all its static, repetitive atmospherics, Burstein's melodic, neo-classical score – the tango for torture, a waltz for the White House – is badly let down by Dic Edwards's libretto, which ranges from the crudest anti-American satire to the most banal, platitudinous failure to explain the appeal of politico-religious duty (i.e. suicide bombing) over love." The Sunday Telegraph described the opera as "political, prescient and unmissable".

=== Edinburgh 2005 ===
For the Edinburgh production of 2005, the performers were almost universally praised by the critics, but the response to the work itself was profoundly divided.

Of the reviews which dealt more substantially with the opera itself, the British Theatre Guide's Peter Latham described the Edinburgh production as "a powerful piece, powerfully performed. ... Political opera is a very rare bird, even today, and this piece is one to be cherished," while asserting that "it is right that opera should take on such subjects" and noting that Burstein's music was "more melodic than most modern opera." On EdinburghGuide.com, Alex Eades commented "Manifest Destiny will haunt your soul for many a day. Of all the performances based around terrorism this year, this is the one to see. A miracle of a show that is sometimes beautiful and sometimes horrible. It is, however, always unforgettable." The Scotsman commented "Operatic themes do not come more epic than this."

In the Scotsman on Sunday, Michael McManus was particularly complimentary, comparing Manifest Destiny to Michael Tippett's A Child of Our Time and praising the "brave, touching and timely work" as "a dazzling, dark opera ... affecting, bold, potent and perhaps most importantly of all, packed with melodic invention... Mahlerian harmonies and rhythmic patterns, a gorgeous waltz, and a cynical tango. ... Time and again – as in the greatest operatic works – tonal resolution and emotional closure come hand-in hand" The reviewer also commented "Like so much great art, Manifest Destiny marries the personal with the political, the particular and the universal... A simple and humanitarian message shines through unambiguously; that violence begets only violence in a cycle which must be broken as an act of human will; and that love is stronger than hatred."

The Daily Telegraph's David Gritten described the opera as "rigorous and high minded, with a story in the environs of Greek tragedy" and praised Burstein's ambition and the music (which the reviewer found "mournful" and "affecting"), but attacked Edwards' libretto as "stilted" and the political content as "banal and fatally one-sided," In a combined feature/review of political works at the 2005 Fringe, the Sunday Herald's Iain McWhirter hailed Manifest Destiny as a "scintillating if flawed opera – with a witty and surprisingly melodic neo-classical score" but argued that "the politics are sometimes risible (and) the ultimate message, that love can triumph over religion and bring Jew and Muslim together, is unconvincing. Nevertheless, Manifest Destiny is a considerable piece of work, dealing with important themes, which demands to be heard."

Anna Picard, in The Independent on Sunday, was particularly dismissive of Manifest Destiny, describing it as "sixth-form satire", and attacking the music for "the abject narrowness of its harmonic language and the robotic word-setting." She also compared the opera unfavourably to John Adams’ The Death of Klinghoffer (another opera dealing with terrorism and the Middle Eastern conflict, which was being revived at the Edinburgh Festival Fringe at the same time).

==== Libel case ====
A particularly damning response to the Edinburgh production was written by the London Evening Standard's Veronica Lee. Although she praised the cast for their performances, she described to the opera overall as "a trite affair", the music as "uninspiring, save for the odd duet" and to the libretto as "horribly leaden and unmusical". Lee concluded her review with the comment "I found the tone depressingly anti-American, and the idea that there is anything heroic about suicide bombers is, frankly, a grievous insult." (The Sunday Herald review had made a similar comment, stating that although Manifest Destiny deserved to be heard "it won't be if the thought police get hold of it. For it undoubtedly justifies and arguably glorifies terrorism.")

Following the review of Manifest Destiny in the London Evening Standard, Keith Burstein sued Associated Newspapers (the newspaper's parent organisation) for libel in 2005. He did so on the grounds that the review (although it did not specifically contain the words 'glorify' or 'glorification') claimed that he had glorified terrorism via the content of the opera, and that this was not only libellous but left him open to the risk of state prosecution under both the recently passed Prevention of Terrorism Act of 2005 (which explicitly names "promotion of terrorism" as a criminal act) and the incoming Terrorism Act of 2006 (at the time, a Terrorism Bill) which featured a retrospective "glorification of terrorism" clause.

The case (Burstein vs Associated Newspapers Ltd.) first went to the High Court and then to the Court of Appeal. The first of these hearings favoured Burstein, granting him the opportunity of taking the case to a trial by jury. The second judgement overturned the first (while admitting that it was "very unusual" to overturn a High Court ruling for a jury hearing) and found in favour of Associated Newspapers. The result was that costs were awarded against Burstein and he was consequently forced into bankruptcy. Although Burstein subsequently took the case to the European Court of Human Rights his application was rejected.

The court case and its aftermath inspired a subsequent theatrical play, The Trainer, written by David Wilson and Anne Aylor (with co-writes by Burstein). Premiered at Oxford House, London, in March 2009, the play covered a fictionalised version of the events of the trial, in parallel with a separate plot strand similar to one used in Manifest Destiny. Actors involved in the production included Corin Redgrave and Tim Pigott-Smith who played Burstein, and further cast members included Janie Dee and Roger Lloyd-Pack.The production went on to be performed at the Hackney Empire theatre in May 2009.

=== Roles ===
Roles, voice types, premiere cast
Role	Voice type	Cast: Cockpit Theatre, November 2003 Tricycle Theatre, 27 June 2004 Edinburgh Festival Fringe, 6–29 August 2005
Leila (Palestinian émigré and poet, would-be suicide bomber)	soprano	Cockpit & Tricycle: Bernadette Lord; Edinburgh: Bernadette Lord
Daniel Xavier (Anglo-Jewish composer)	tenor	Cockpit & Tricycle: Alexander Anderson-Hall; Edinburgh: Peter Furlong
Mohammed (Palestinian political activist and would-be suicide bomber)	baritone	Cockpit & Tricycle: James McOran-Campbell; Edinburgh: Paul Carey Jones
Omah (Palestinian political activist and suicide bomber)	tenor	Cockpit & Tricycle: James McOran-Campbell; Edinburgh: Peter Furlong
Mrs President (newly elected President of the USA)	soprano	Cockpit: (role not performed); Tricycle: Bernadette Lord; Edinburgh: Bernadette Lord
Mr Director of CIA (American government official)	baritone	Cockpit: (role not performed); Tricycle: Peter Willcock; Edinburgh: Peter Willcock
CIA Man (Afghanistan-based American intelligence officer)	baritone	Cockpit: (role not performed); Tricycle: Peter Willcock; Edinburgh: Peter Willcock
Jailer (unnamed Guantanamo Bay guard)	baritone	Cockpit: (role not performed); Tricycle: Peter Willcock; Edinburgh: Peter Willcock

In productions to date, the opera's eight characters have been performed by singers doubling or tripling roles.

== Synopsis ==
(adapted and condensed from theatre programme from 2005 Edinburgh production, and by referencing the privately circulated DVD recording of the opera, also from the Edinburgh production)

The action takes place variously in London, Palestine, Afghanistan, the White House in Washington, D.C., and Camp X-Ray, Guantánamo Bay.

=== Act 1 ===
Scene 1 – London

"Our starting point was: where do suicide bombers come from? They don't just drop from the sky. This whole thing goes back way before 9/11; the jihad began in Afghanistan with the Russian invasion and then it was carried on with the Americans in Saudi Arabia during the first Gulf War. To say they are mindless people is not addressing the problem. To be a suicide bomber is an act of despair; there's nothing more useless or hopeless."

— Dic Edwards, commenting on the inspirations for Manifest Destiny in The Observer

Leila, a Palestinian Arab poet, lives in London with Daniel Xavier, a British Jewish composer. In addition to being lovers, the two are artistic collaborators, as Leila is writing a libretto for Daniel's music. However, their partnership is threatened by the pressures of world events and the effects of those events on their own beliefs and loyalties.

Leila's outrage at the iniquities of the post-9/11 world and the growing "war on terror" have led into pro-Palestinian political activism. From this, she has moved into a form of militant Islamism: to this end, she has established links with a suicide bomb cell in Jerusalem run by her friends Omah and Mohammed. She intends to join the cell and pursue martyrdom as part of her personal jihad. Meanwhile, a despairing and angry Daniel is gradually going blind. He considers his condition to be a response to the trauma of world events, now dominated by a clash between the West and the retaliatory terrorism of the 'third world' whose spiritual values are perceived to be under threat.

As the opera begins, Daniel angrily denounces the state of the world. (Aria: "O Israel") Torn between her love for Daniel and her loyalty to Palestine, Leila chooses to return to Palestine and join the suicide bomb cell. (Duet: "You’ve been crying.") Daniel attempts to persuade her otherwise but she is adamant (Duet: "Revenge is futile") and after a harrowing debate, the two part (Duet: "Now is the beginning of my world, my night.").

As Daniel plunges deeper into despair, his blindness takes hold. A parade of horrific images begins to pass before his mind, mirroring the events that led to this crossroads. These included the political rise of Ariel Sharon, the Palestinian Intifada; the election of George W. Bush as American president (with the apparent complicity of the Florida Supreme Court); the atrocities of 9/11 and the subsequent atrocities in Afghanistan, Iraq and across the world. (Aria: "These?") Daniel's sense of responsibility intensifies. His ability to act is paralyzed by his loss of Leila, whose unfinished poem on the struggle for freedom and justice was his inspiration.

Scene 2 – Palestine

"I think we are too unwilling to think about terrorists and their motives seriously. Most people, even enlightened and liberal ones, still think that suicide bombers are evil, mad and totally fanatical. But maybe it's more a case of normal people whose values and existence are threatened. I don't think we can allow ourselves to see Islamic fundamentalists simply as enemies... An opera can penetrate contemporary events emotionally and lay bare the motives of the characters with absolute clarity. Operas are principally concerned with love, but also with feelings like anger, fear and confusion – all the emotions that were encompassed in the reaction to September 11... Opera needs to be reinvigorated so that people realise just how well it can deal with contemporary themes."

— Keith Burstein, from an interview with Süddeutsche Zeitung,

Leila joins Omah and Mohammed in the suicide bomb cell. She finds them apparently devoted to their martyrdom, believing themselves to already be ascending towards heaven. (Trio: "We’ll give our lives to fight") Fervently chanting "we love death more than they love life", they don explosive devices and prepare to detonate themselves amongst the Israelis, whom they see as their oppressors. (Song and chorus: "What we are doing may seem monstrous."). Omah then leaves to carry out his suicide mission.

However, Mohammed has fallen in love with Leila, and the sight of her preparing for her own suicide mission finally completes a change in him. He decides that her power of creativity is a greater power than that of violence; and that her poetic vision, not her power to kill, is her true duty to Islam. Declaring his love, Mohammed attempts to dissuade her from her course. (Song: "Not yet, Leila, not yet.")

Rejecting Mohammed's adoration, Leila in turn realises that she has confused her own passion for the cause with her friendship with Mohammed, and that she is still in love with Daniel. (Duet: "I am confused – my passion is to fight.") Abandoning her suicide mission, Leila leaves both Mohammed and the bomber cell, choosing to pursue her spiritual struggle further afield – in Afghanistan.

Alone, Mohammed admits that his love of Leila is more powerful than his commitment to martyrdom. (Aria: "This pain is too real – greater than all the grief of Islam"). He turns away from insurgency and terrorism, realising that he has the alternative of following a peaceful course drawn from the heart of his Islamic beliefs. Mohammed decides to follow Leila to Afghanistan and perhaps save her from herself ("for Islam and for Man.") Defusing and destroying his suicide bomb, he declares "I love life more than I love death."

=== Act 2 ===
Scene 1 – The White House, Washington DC

In the Oval Office of the White House, the newly elected US President is seen celebrating with her CIA Director after the President's Inaugural Ball. (Duet: "The Oval Office!") They muse idly about their global ambitions. The Director shocks the President by telling her she can become "the first American Emperor." (Duet: "So where do we begin, Mrs President?")

Scene 2 – Afghanistan/London

In parallel scenes, Daniel (in London) and Leila, Mohammed and a CIA Man (in Afghanistan) progress through the next developments in the drama.

While Daniel and Leila call out to the memory of each other (Aria: "So cold on this mountain top" and duet: "Oh Daniel!"), Mohammed, captured by American forces, is beaten by the CIA Man, but embraces his torturer and pledges loyalty (Duet: "Shall we bugger you to save you?"). Leila recalls how European-Americans destroyed the Native Americans for the sake of gold with their "Manifest Destiny" policy. She fears that a similar fate awaits the Arabs for the sake of their oil, and pleads that the Arabs only want to live in "the beauty of their beliefs." (Aria: "For a century Western nations have brought terror to Arabia")

In their separate worlds, Daniel, Leila, Mohammed and the CIA Man muse on the situation (Quartet: "Parallels"). Mohammed then decides to betray Leila to the US forces (Duet: "I can give you a leading terrorist"). Privately, he reasons that this will save her life and her soul: if she is still intending to be a suicide bomber, imprisonment will ensure that she cannot kill either herself or others. However, the decision causes him anguish and doubt (Aria: "To be blind...") In London, Daniel sings of his continuing faith in Leila (Aria: "Leila, redeemer of my memory").

Scene 3 – The White House, Washington DC

The President expresses misgivings about attacking Arabian states, and fears "as a mother" for "the children of Arabia." (Duet: "I feel so uncertain") Her moment of conscience puts her into a brief moral conflict with the Director, who states that Arabian resources "belong to the world" and that America, on behalf of the world, must "rescue" those resources with war as the necessary tool. He sweeps aside the President's protests – claiming that the war will last beyond her term of office anyway – and insists that she signs the authorization to send American forces into battle. (Duet: "Mrs President – the Arabians have oil").

As the President signs, she and the Director are interrupted by the sudden arrival of Mohammed, who has convinced his captors of his value as a double agent. He is duly dispatched to Guantanamo Bay by his new American masters, who believe that he will be able to extract secrets from the detainees there. Carried away by the moment, the Director announces that a new Manifest Destiny now applies to everyone ("even the bums on our campuses!") and that this is the beginning of "full spectrum dominance – pre-emptive strikes against everyone." (Trio: "Mrs P, meet Mohammed!")

Mohammed's true motive for travelling to Guantanamo, however, is to seek redemption and forgiveness from Leila, who has been captured by the Americans on his information and is now imprisoned in Camp X-Ray. (Aria: "When I betrayed Leila")

=== Act 3 ===
Scene 1 – Camp X-Ray, Guantanamo Bay (Leila's cell)

"The War On Terror has by now provoked many stage works, many commentaries, many biting satires. But all that seemed important to me was to look straight into the heart of darkness and, like a magician pulling a rabbit from a hat, to pull out light... My motive began as outrage, to tell the truth our Western governments were not telling us... And yet, even as these concerns formed the structure of our plot, so that outline was filled in by something else unexpectedly: by interweaving love stories, by a sacrament of compassion and divine forgiveness falling across all who strayed along this fateful path."

— Keith Burstein in programme notes for the opera's Edinburgh Fringe Festival run in 2005

In Camp X-Ray, Leila is beaten by a Jailer, who also mocks her writings (Duet: "What is this? It’s not poetry.") Her spirit all but broken, Leila pleas for an end to her suffering (Aria: "Let me die"). Despite himself, the Jailer is moved to a kind of remorse: declaring "no, I will save you" he unbinds her and goes in search of water. Left alone, Leila sings of how war has despoiled her homeland and its people (Aria: "There is a tree in my mother’s garden")

The Jailer returns. As an act of contrition, he washes Leila's feet and attempts – in his way – to comfort her. However, his comfort mostly takes the form of assurances that she and her people will be safe once their country has been conquered and restructured to American standards. (Aria: "We are not here to hurt you"). Leila's journey through idealism, rage, capture, torment and imprisonment has been too much for her. She prophecies "when this is over, I’ll be dead".

Scene 2 – Camp X-Ray, Guantanamo Bay (a waiting room)

Several days later, Mohammed arrives on his mission from the White House. He waits patiently to see Leila, and daydreams of forgiveness and a new life for them in America (Aria: "Waiting in this room"). The Jailer enters and sadly reveals that Mohammed is too late: Leila has killed herself, having hanged herself in her cell. (Duet: "Are you Mohammed"). The grief-stricken Mohammed demands Leila's manuscript (Duet: "No, Death's breathing is her life") and the Jailer gives it to him. Mohammed departs with the manuscript.

Scene 3 – London

Outside Daniel's London studio, dawn has arrived. As the sun rises, little by little Daniel's sight miraculously returns. (Aria: "Today the light comes dripping like a honey’d thread") He is overjoyed, although he wonders why this has happened with Leila still not returned and "the world not mended yet".

In the flood of brilliant light, Mohammed arrives from Guantanamo. He hands the apprehensive Daniel Leila's libretto (Duet: "My name is Mohammed"). On the front, Daniel reads the words Manifest Destiny. Mohammed tells Daniel that Leila has set out a stark choice in her prayer for peace . (Duet: "She has written 'we have this choice...death or love'")

Mohammed tells Daniel "she died loving you." Heartbroken, Daniel confesses that he is a Jew, but Mohammed simply replies "I know." The two men – the Jewish composer and the Palestinian former suicide bomber – have been united by their love and grief for the same woman. They embrace in a spirit of tragedy, forgiveness and hope. A resigned but determined Mohammed resolves to go home to Palestine, despite Daniel's concerned warning that "they will kill you". As Mohammed departs, Daniel is left alone to finally set Leila's poetry to music.

== Content ==
=== Musical elements ===
The opera is a through-sung music drama. The music is tonal in nature, in common with the body of Burstein's music. The score also incorporates sardonic waltzes, tangos and echoes of American marching tunes during the sections involving American characters and scenes.

The 2003, 2004 and 2005 productions featured music provided entirely by voices and solo piano (played by Burstein himself).The 2005 Edinburgh Festival Fringe production also utilised a fragment of rock music – an excerpt of the song Telescopic by the British band Suns of the Tundra (this was inserted at the start of the prison sequence to represent the use of sonic psychological warfare by the US Army, and is not considered to be part of the score itself). Manifest Destiny 2011 featured a quartet arrangement (two violins, cello and clarinet).

=== Dramatic elements and staging ===
The opera utilizes a wide variety of theatrical techniques and approaches including tragedy, black comedy, satire, sections which can be played as dream sequences, agit-prop, expressionism, and parallel scenes. Dramatic and metaphorical themes include revenge, terrorism (and its definitions), blindness, redemption through love, pacifism and imperialism. At the time of the Edinburgh production, director David Wybrow described Manifest Destiny as "opera-noir: a new melodramatic theatre that reaches for the emotional intensity of opera in order to take on the profoundly disorientating anxieties of the twenty-first century."

The staging for the production has generally been minimalist (the 2005 Edinburgh Festival Fringe production used three black boxes and assorted props) and involved multimedia (projections, animations and subtitles/surtitles – some key information in the opera has been conveyed via these methods in the manner of a film or television piece).

=== Political content ===
The tone of Manifest Destiny's libretto is forthright, reflecting Burstein and Edwards' shared view of the state of current world affairs.

"(Manifest Destiny is partially inspired by) the breakdown of accepted divisions and barriers, where global phenomena such as AIDS, accelerated ecological change, urban poverty and uncontained war threaten us with their ability to cross boundaries and sweep away the safe space of individual difference. (It) suggests that in these fluid circumstances, no-one can any longer afford to mistake ideology for truth: that totalizing and exclusive world-views of all kinds are obsolete and dangerous, and that the intellectual survival-strategies of powerful vested interests must give way before the imperative for new kinds of human relationship... Whatever the purpose of terrorism is thought to be, its limits as a weapon of propaganda lie in its tendency to draw attention only to itself, rather than the issues under protest. The moral and intellectual tunnel vision this induces, as the world’s power-elites narrow their standpoints and demonise the opposition, is the political equivalent of the trauma-induced physical blindness suffered by Daniel (in the opera).”

— Director David Wybrow, in programme notes for the opera's Edinburgh Fringe Festival run in 2005

The President is portrayed as being morally compromised – able to ask questions about the ethics of situations but generally not comprehending the consequences (despite a fleeting attack of conscience in the third act). Mr Director of CIA is portrayed as a brutal Machiavellian committed to the concept of the New American Century and using a mixture of temptation, moral seduction and bullying to achieve his ends. He does however appear to believe he has moral justification, citing the protection of the world's oil.

The CIA Man in Afghanistan who abuses the character Mohammed is similarly brutal, threatening Mohammed with both actual and symbolic rape. The Jailer in Guantanamo Bay who abuses the character Leila is initially presented as brutal, scornful and openly violent. He later attempts to make amends for this in a mysterious act of washing Leila's feet and reveals that he has a vision of her redeemed by submission to western values.

The Palestinian suicide bombers are portrayed as a mixed group. Some of them are irrevocably committed to violent rhetoric and violent action; whilst others question and change their own attitudes (or have them compromised) during the course of the opera.

Manifest Destiny is also notable for having predicted the Abu Ghraib prisoner abuses at least a year before they occurred in real life. When written in 2002, the opera contained two sequences featuring abuse of a Muslim prisoner by an American guard (one set in Afghanistan and the other in Guantánamo Bay detention camp). In an article written for The Guardian, Burstein reflected:

"Dic had uncanny foresight in 2003, when he wrote Manifest Destiny's torture scenes in Afghanistan and Guantanamo with sexual abuse against detainees – long before the full news broke. By May 2004, the abuses of prisoners in Abu Ghraib had become public knowledge, even iconic images. We found the whole scenario of the opera flooding the world to a degree that we could not have predicted when we wrote it. Perhaps, however, we all knew subconsciously that Abu Ghraib was inevitable -it just took a librettist of Dic’s prescience to imagine it and set it down in drama."

== Recordings ==
Although performance recordings (both audio and video) exist, Manifest Destiny has not yet been recorded for professional release. Home-made copies of a video recording of the 2005 production have been circulated on DVD at related events and some clips are viewable on YouTube.
