= Two Controversies and a Conversation =

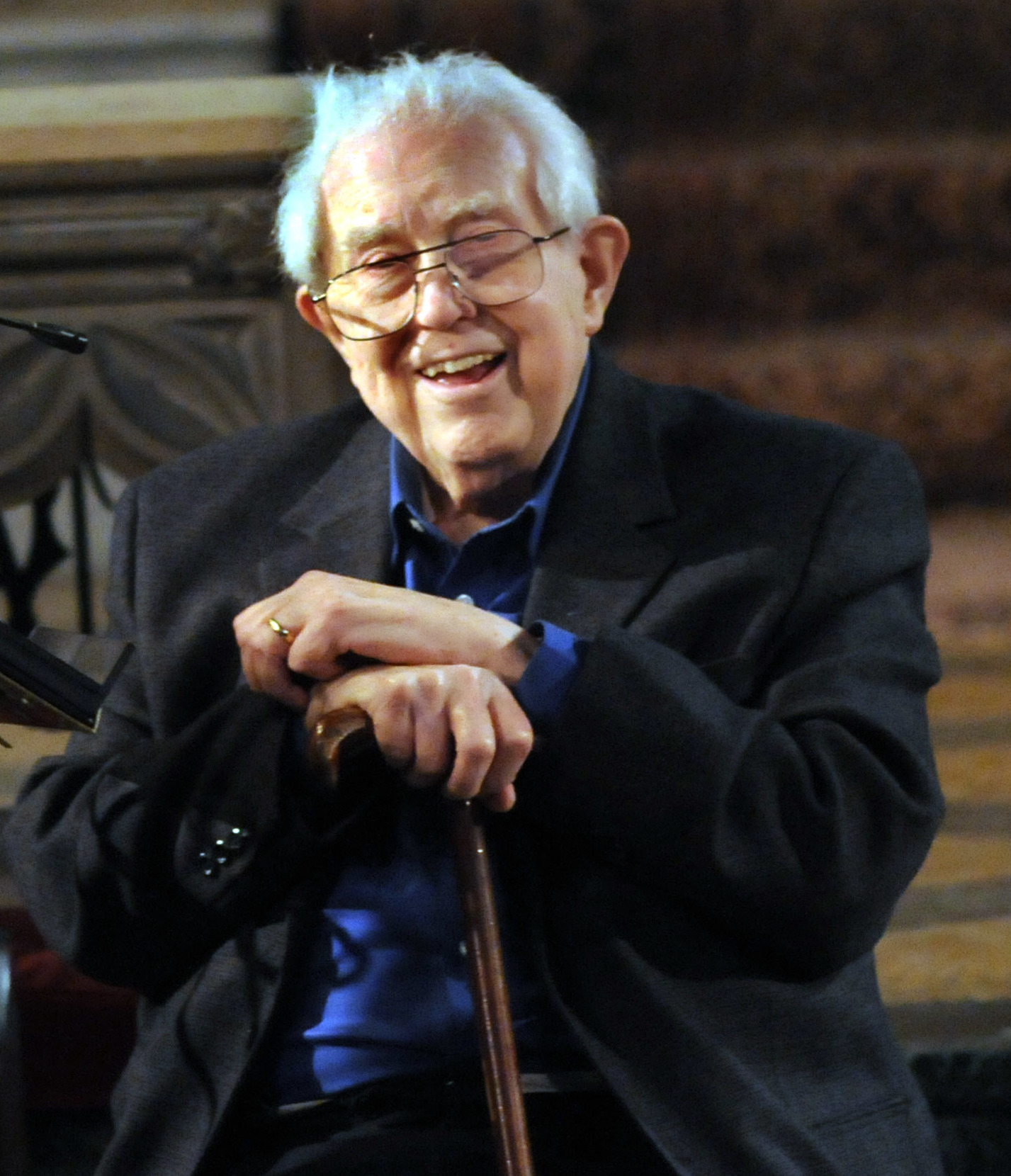
Elliott Carter in 2007

Two Controversies and a Conversation is a composition for piano, percussion, and chamber orchestra by the American composer Elliott Carter. Its world premiere was given on June 8, 2012, at the Metropolitan Museum of Art in New York City by the pianist Eric Huebner and the percussionist Colin Currie with the New York Philharmonic under the direction of David Robertson. The piece is dedicated to Colin Currie and the pianist Pierre-Laurent Aimard. It was one of the last works composed by Carter, who completed the piece at the age of 103.

== Composition ==
=== Background ===
Carter originally composed the final movement as a standalone piece titled Conversations, but the composer later expanded the work into three movements at the suggestion of the conductor Oliver Knussen. In the score program notes, Carter wrote, "After the premiere of Conversations at the Aldeburgh Festival in June of 2011 Oliver Knussen suggested that I expand this piece. I decided to add two more movements, which became the two controversies. The first of the two controversies has the percussion in the leading role and the second features the piano which ends the movement in a flourish." For a complete performance of the work, the third movement was retitled to the singular "Conversation."

=== Structure ===
Two Controversies and a Conversation has a duration of roughly 11 minutes and is cast in three movements:

1. Controversy I
2. Controversy II
3. Conversation

=== Instrumentation ===
The work is scored for solo piano and percussion and a chamber orchestra consisting of flute (doubling piccolo), two oboes, two clarinets (1st doubling E♭ clarinet; 2nd doubling bass clarinet), bassoon, horn, two trumpets, trombone, and strings.

== Reception ==
Two Controversies and a Conversation has been praised by music critics. Reviewing the world premiere, Steve Smith of The New York Times described it as "in effect a pocket-size double concerto" and said the work "took full advantage of its confident soloists." He added, "Two initial movements engaged the soloists in volleys of brittle one-upmanship, with no small show of athleticism from the constantly sprinting Mr. Currie. The last and longest eased them into more involved exchanges. The applause for Mr. Carter, by then using a wheelchair but characteristically animated, resounded thunderously." Martin Bernheimer of the Financial Times similarly said the piece "emerges as a genial, economic rumination on percussive structures and strictures" and wrote, "Colin Currie and Eric Huebner, the soloists, trade snappy, tricky rhythmic impulses on a piano plus numerous tapping/stroking/banging devices. Supporting instruments add unpredictable commentary and echoes. As always, Carter ignores aesthetic concessions and stylistic compromises."

Kate Molleson of The Guardian later described the music as "playfully antagonistic" and the music critic David Patrick Stearns of ArtsJournal said it "shows [Carter] at his wittiest, tossing about unexpected percussion sounds in close succession, thwarting aural expectations, rushing in all directions at one moment, and ending with a single, isolated ping-like bell. Maybe Carter was saying 'Bye bye!' That was his kind of swan song."
