= Nazor =

Nazor is a surname. Notable people with the surname include:

- Ante Nazor (basketball) (born 1978), Croatian basketball coach
- Ante Nazor (historian) (born 1968), Croatian historian
- Vladimir Nazor (1876–1949), Croatian poet and politician
