= Goran Filipec =

- Born: 1981 (age 44–45); Rijeka, Croatia
- Genres: Classical music
- Occupation: Classical pianist
- Instrument: Piano
- Labels: Naxos Records, Goran Filipec Productions
- Website: goran-filipec.com

Goran Filipec (born 1981 in Rijeka) is a Croatian concert pianist.

== Biography ==
During his early career Filipec won top prizes at international piano competitions (José Iturbi International Music Competition in Los Angeles in 2009; Concurso de Parnassos in Monterrey in 2010; Gabala International Piano Competition in Azerbaijan in 2009; Concorso Pianistico Internazionale Franz Liszt - "Premio Mario Zanfi" in Parma in 2011).

Filipec has performed internationally, having performed at the Carnegie Hall, Auditorium di Milano, Mariinsky Theatre, Béla Bartók National Concert Hall in Budapest, Philharmonie de Paris and other concert halls of Europe, North and South America and Japan.

He studied piano at the Academy "Ino Mirkovich", and got a doctorate in music from Sorbonne University, he later specialized at the Hochschüle für Musik Köln, Oxana Yablonskaya Piano Institute, Moscow state conservatory "P.I.Tchaikovsky" and the Royal Conservatoire of The Hague. His most important piano teachers were Naum Grubert, Oxana Yablonskaya and Natalia Trull.

He founded the Société Franz Liszt de Genève, a group based on researching and promoting Franz Liszt's music.

== Discography ==
- 2016 – Franz Liszt: Paganini Studies (CD) /Naxos Records
- 2014 – Ivo Maček: Complete piano works & Sonata for violin and piano (CD) /Naxos Records
- 2012 – Liszt’s anniversary resonances (2CD) / Goran Filipec Productions
- 2006 – Goran Filipec plays Rachmaninov & Mussorgsky (CD) / Eroica Classical Recordings
