= Dic Edwards =

British writer

Dic Edwards (born 1948) is a Welsh playwright, poet and teacher of creative writing. His writing often touches upon political and social issues, nationalism and democracy.

== Early life ==
Edwards was born in Cardiff. He was educated at Whitchurch High (Grammar), Cardiff, St David's University College, Lampeter, Hughes Hall, Cambridge and the University of Wales at Aberystwyth.

== Career ==
Edwards' early work was produced at the Sherman Theatre, Cardiff. These included At The End of The Bay, Canned Goods and Looking For The World. At the beginning of his career, he was introduced to Edward Bond who became, and still is, a supporter of his work.

Before taking up a residency at Theatr Clwyd in 1989 and producing the play the fourth world, Edwards worked with The Haymarket Theatre in Leicester where his productions were Long To Rain Over Us and Low People.

At this time Edwards began to be published by Oberon Books Ltd., London. Its publishing editor, James Hogan, encouraged The Citizens' Theatre, Glasgow to produce his play Casanova Undone which was followed a year later by Wittgenstein's Daughter. Both were subsequently produced at The White Bear Theatre in London.

In the early 1990s Edwards worked with Mark Dornford May at Broomhill which resulted in the opera The Juniper Tree, written with composer Andrew Toovey and The Beggar's New Clothes, a reworking of The Beggar's Opera, with music by Warren Belshaw. The latter transferred to The Cockpit Theatre, London.

Edwards returned to working in Wales with Sgript Cymru, and in 2002, his comedy titled Franco's Bastard was produced at the Chapter Arts Centre in Cardiff. The play revisits Edwards' time as a young student at Lampeter University, when he met the controversial Welsh nationalist activist and leader of the Free Wales Army (FWA), Julian Cayo-Evans. Edwards recounted how he was attacked by Cayo-Evans and another man after they mistakenly believed him to have attempted to burn down a cottage at a party, which resulted in a month's stay at Chepstow Hospital where Edwards' head injuries were treated. However, Cayo-Evans later apologised for the altercation, and the two became friends. The play centres on a sometimes scathing and sometimes affectionate account of the charismatic Cayo-Evans. During the play's premier, a group of Welsh nationalists protested the play by leading walkouts and throwing stink bombs, an event that prompted questions in parliament. Following the controversy surrounding the play, Edwards stated that "the play wasn't biographical" and apologised to Cayo-Evans' children for any offence caused.

In 2003, Edwards wrote the libretto for Keith Burstein's opera, Manifest Destiny. The opera was performed at The Tricycle Theatre, London as a benefit for the Redgraves' Guantanamo Human Rights Commission and subsequently played at The Edinburgh Festival in 2005. At the same time, in the same season, Cambridge University's ADC produced Edwards' play Astrakhan (Winter).

In 2013, after writing The Opportunist for The University of Michigan, Ann Arbor, Edwards turned away from writing for the theatre, arguing that "British Theatre has become a director's theatre. Directors want an easy life and, in the main, hire only TV writers now."

His play Over Milk Wood, a response to the radio play by Dylan Thomas, has been translated into Catalan as Sobre El Bosc Lacti and published by Arola Editors, Tarragona.

There have been productions of his work at NIDA in Sydney, Australia and That Theatre, Copenhagen, Denmark and a public reading of The Pimp in New York.

For many years, Edwards has worked with Theatre in Education companies most notably Spectacle Theatre and collaborated very successfully with director Steve Davis.

Edwards has recently finished The Vote, a play about the collapse of British democracy. He is working on Nude a play about the Welsh painter Augustus John. He is also working on a collection of short stories with the working title From the Backland.

Edwards founded the Creative Writing program at University of Wales Trinity Saint David, Lampeter, where he was a lecturer until 2019. He is the editor and founder of the literary magazine The Lampeter Review.

== Personal life ==
Edwards is married to Gwenda and has three children and eight grandchildren. He lives in Aberaeron in West Wales.

== Selected produced works ==
=== Theatre ===
- Late City Echo (1981), Sherman Arena Cardiff
- At the End of the Bay (1982), Sherman Arena, Cardiff
- Canned Goods (1983), Sherman Arena, Cardiff
- Looking for the World (1986), Sherman Main Stage, Cardiff †
- Long To Rain Over Us (1987), Haymerket Theatre, Leicester †
- low people (1989), Haymarket Theatre, Leicester
- the fourth world (1990), Theatr Clwyd †
- Regan, 1991, Theatr Powys
- Casanova Undone (1992), Citizens Theatre, Glasgow and The White Bear, London †
- The Juniper Tree (1992), Opera Libretto, Broomhill Opera, Kent
- The Beggar's New Clothes (1992), book and lyrics, Broomhill Opera, Kent and Cockpit Theatre, London
- Wittgenstein's Daughter (1993), Citizens Theatre, Glasgow and The White Bear, London †
- Utah Blue (1995), The Point, Cardiff †
- Lola Brecht (1995), Castaway, UK Tour †
- Manifest Destiny (2005), Tricycle Theatre, London, Assembly Rooms, Edinburgh Festival, Opera Close Up, London
- Astrakhan (Winter) (2005), Cambridge ADC, Edinburgh Festival †
- The Pimp (2006), The White Bear, London †
- The Opportunist (2013) Basement Players, University of Michigan, US

† Published by Oberon Books, London

Also published:

- The Shakespeare Factory and other plays for children, Seren Books (1998)
- Sobre El Bosc Lacti, Arola Editors, Tarragona (2002)
- Kid, Argraff, Cardiff (2004)
- Solitude, (In Two Immorality Plays) Oberon Books, London (2007)

=== Poetry ===
- Walt Whitman and Other Poems (2008)
- Pieces in The Manhattan Review, Poetry Wales etc.
