= Cockpit Theatre, Marylebone =

Theatre in Marylebone, London, England

The Cockpit
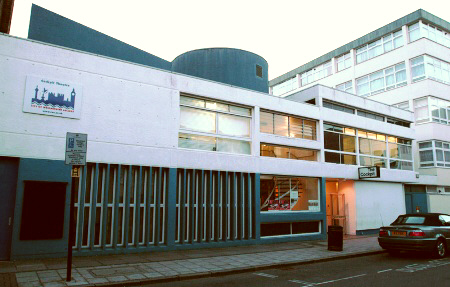
- Interactive map of The Cockpit
- Address: Gateforth Street; London, NW8; United Kingdom
- Coordinates: 51.52451°N 0.1696°W
- Owner: United Colleges Group
- Capacity: 180 thrust, 240 in-the-round
- Type: Fringe theatre
- Public transit: Marylebone

Construction
- Opened: 1970; 56 years ago
- Architect: Edward Mendelsohn

Website
- www.thecockpit.org.uk

The Cockpit is a fringe theatre in Marylebone, London.

Designed by Edward Mendelsohn and built in 1969–70 by the Inner London Education Authority (ILEA) as the Gateforth Youth Arts Centre, it is London's first purpose-built Theatre in the round since the Great Fire of London. When ILEA was disbanded in 1990, ownership of the Cockpit was transferred to the London Borough of Westminster, who made it part of the newly renamed City of Westminster College. The Cockpit is the only purpose-built, free standing, commercially operating theatre training venue in the capital.

Between 1993 and 1995 the Soho Theatre Company rented the theatre from City Of Westminster College and relaunched itself after a period of homelessness. During this period they premiered the works of over 35 new writers.

Apart from the Soho residency, from the time of its handover from the Greater London Council to the City of Westminster College until 2011 it was used as a training venue for the City of Westminster College's performing arts, theatre lighting, sound engineering and media students, along with regularly visiting students from Ball State University and young people from The Prince's Trust. The Cockpit hosted regular training opportunities in technical theatre skills such as rigging and pyrotechnics, and was (and continues to be) popular with drama schools and youth groups. For many years it hosted the National Youth Jazz Orchestra's weekend rehearsals every Saturday and DreamArts every term-time Sunday.

In January 2011, owners City of Westminster College moved into their new main building at Paddington Green which included another theatre. This change meant The Cockpit was no longer used for day-to-day teaching and instead commenced extensive full-time programme development as one of the larger fringe theatre venues in London, retaining its commitment to young and emerging artists.

The cockpit remains a campus of United Colleges Group.

== The auditorium ==
Auditorium as seen from upstage-left

The auditorium is 8.5m high and 11m^{2} with a retractable seating bank on all four sides. Each bank seats 60 people and the seat cushions and backrests can be removed to create alternative playing areas. With the upstage, left and right banks retracted, the downstage centre bank can be pulled out from the standard four rows to 10 rows, creating an end-on configuration. The stage measures 6.6m x 8.6m in thrust setting and 6.6m x 5.9m in-the-round.

Upstage, a series of trapdoors span the width of the stage with a series of movable and replaceable panels covering them. Under the stage is a large manually winched lift (out of service) which can roll along the span of the traps. Although these could be used for stage effects, original plans show this sub-stage area marked as a "chair store" and was to be used as the storage area for seats removed when reconfiguring the space.

=== Lighting ===
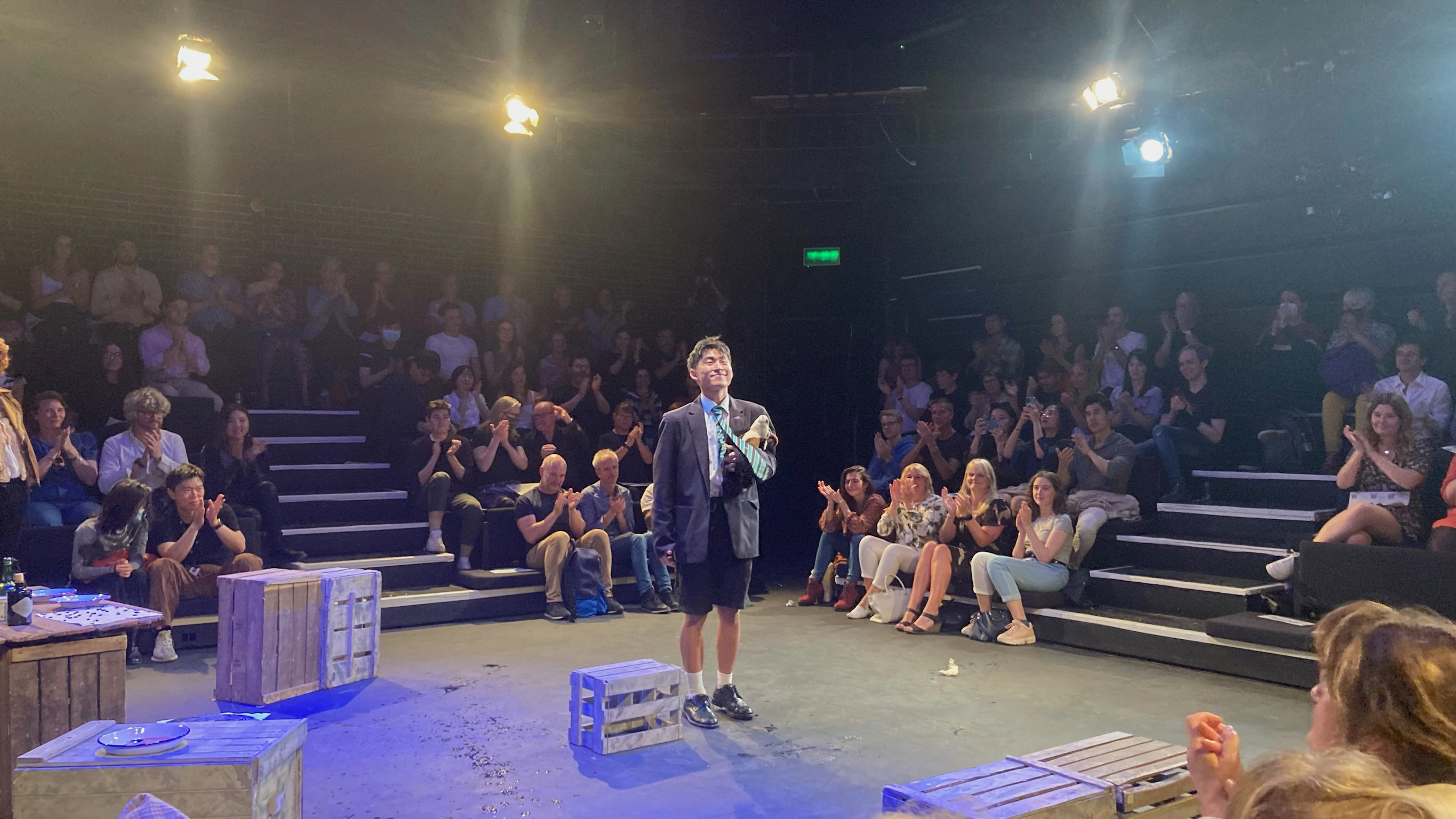
A 2022 production at the theatre, part of the Tête à Tête Opera Festival

There are 2 lighting gantries surrounding the space with the control box on the lower gantry, above the downstage centre seating bank. The lower gantry is 3.5m from the stage, the upper is 6.21m from the stage and each gantry has two scaffold bars for the rigging of lanterns or scenery. The upper gantry also includes a central T-shaped walkway, with the top edge of the T on the upstage side of the auditorium. The T, and both gantries have 15A power outlets for plugging stage lighting into. These sockets are connected to three Strand STM dimmers, providing 60 ways of dimming. This equipment was installed when the Cockpit first opened and remains operational, as are many of the lanterns.

The design of the gantries allows for access to all lighting positions without the inherent dangers of a fly system or working up a ladder and the cable trunking surrounding the gantries also act as safety barriers to prevent accidental falls.

== Name ==
Initially the "Gateforth Street Youth Arts Centre" the name 'Cockpit' derived from the 17th century Cockpit Theatre and Cockpit-in-Court, both venues used as theatre and cockfighting rings which nicely echoed the theatre's in-the-round design. Fortuitously, the original design of the foyer floor incorporated a roundel motif which linked nicely to the idea of a plane's cockpit. The name "Cockpit Arts Workshop" was adopted and eventually became the "Cockpit Theatre" or simply the Cockpit".

== Youth work ==
Since its inception, apart from the Soho residency, the Cockpit has been used as a venue for working with young people. The Cockpit Theatre Theatre in Education (TIE) company, started as a pilot project in March 1971 and was the first TIE company to exist within a Local Education Authority. By 1976 it employed six actor-teachers, a director and a stage manager and mostly presented TIE productions at the theatre, and sometimes in secondary schools. An Opera in Education company also ran from the Cockpit Theatre presenting workshops linked to English National Opera productions which students later attended free of charge. Both companies closed when the Greater London Council was abolished in 1986.

== Music In The Round ==
Between April 1971 and November 1972, London Weekend Television recorded "Music In The Round" at the Cockpit. Presented by Humphrey Burton, the show included performances and interviews with leading musicians across a broad range of genres. Amongst talent showcased in the 22 episodes were the National Youth Jazz Orchestra (having already made the Cockpit their home), who were featured on 7 May 1972 and Marc Bolan on 23 April 1972. 'Jazz In The Round' a monthly barrier-busting jazz/contemporary music binge at The Cockpit every last Monday of the month started on 30 January 2012. With a mixture of well known names and unknown artists it aims to bring together bands and artists from different scenes, genres, cultures and generations.

== Other ==
Once a month it runs an award-winning scratch nights called Theatre In The Pound.

Up until The Covid pandemic, the theatre regularly hosted events for Revolution Pro Wrestling. Since lockdown, wrestling has returned to The Cockpit as Mythos Ragnarok, a wrestling re-telling of Nordic mythology. Mythos started life as a Theatre Maker branded supported run for a young company and now tours globally, returning to The Cockpit when in London.

The Cockpit has been run for over 25 years by its current director Dave Wybrow.
