= Armando Chin Yong =

Malaysian opera singer

- Born: 6 July 1958
- Died: 2 February 2011 (aged 52)

Armando Chin Yong (simplified Chinese: 陈容; traditional Chinese: 陳容; pinyin: Chén Róng; Jyutping: Can4 Jung4; Pe̍h-ōe-jī: Tân Iông; Pha̍k-fa-sṳ: Chhìn Yùng) (6 July 1958 – 2 February 2011), also known as Chen Rong in Mandarin Chinese pronunciation, was a Malaysian opera singer. He received much of his singing education in Rome, Italy and Vienna, Austria.

He died unexpectedly, aged 52, of a heart attack after walking his dog in Kuala Lumpur, Malaysia on 2 February 2011 leaving his widow, Chu Shoo Woan and their 12-year-old son, Ian Chin Yi. Armando Chin was a devout Christian and worshipped at Gereja Kristen Grace Taman Bukit Maluri (Taman Bukit Maluri Grace Christian Church), Kepong, Kuala Lumpur.

== Biography ==
Born in Bahau, Negeri Sembilan, Armando Chin grew up under difficult circumstances and had to leave school at age 14 to work to help support his family. He was noted for his natural vocal talent even as a teenager. After considerable hardship, he managed to enroll in the Malaysian Institute of Arts and graduated in 1983, majoring in classical singing. He won the annual Southeast Asian Singing Competition in 1984. In 1985 he went to Rome for advanced vocal studies of the Bel Canto school under Italian tenor, Angelo Marenzi, who was himself a student of the legendary Italian baritone, Tito Gobbi. During his time in Rome he also studied operatic stage performance at the Osimo Opera Art Academy. In 1988, he entered the National Academy of Music and Performing Arts in Vienna, Austria to study vocal music and operatic stage performance under Professor Ralf Döring.

Armando Chin has earned high accolades from European music critics. The Italian newspaper "La Gazzetta" pointed out that when performing the operas of Donizetti and Cilea, he had such an artistic way of controlling the dynamics that it was very close to perfection. In 1987, after a performance of Puccini's one-act opera Gianni Schicchi in Teatro la nuova Fenice in Osimo, Italy, he was hailed by the newspaper Il Messaggero as Italy's most outstanding young tenor. Later in the same year he was again hailed for his performance in Bellini's La Sonnambula at the Bilbao National Opera House, Bilbao, Spain. In 1989, Armando Chin was invited to sing at the Wexford Festival Opera in Wexford, the Republic of Ireland.

From 1990 to 1992, Armando Chin was engaged full-time the Dresden State Opera in Dresden, Germany.

Following his return to Malaysia in 1993, he gave a performance in Taipei, Taiwan followed by a role in Verdi's opera, Rigoletto, in Singapore. In 1994, he sang in Handel's Messiah in Shanghai, China and in Beethoven's 9th Symphony in Hong Kong.

Armando Chin was invited to sing in the 1995 Taipei Charity Concert by Mirella Freni and Nicolai Ghiaurov and sang the encore Libiamo ne' lieti calici (Drinking Song) from Verdi's opera, La traviata, with Mirella Freni. In 1996, he was the solo tenor in the Suntory-sponsored grand production of Beethoven's 9th Symphony with a choir of 10,000 voices performed in Osaka, Japan. In the same year he also took part in the "Remembering Mario Lanza in Concert" tour of Hong Kong, Singapore, Malaysia and the Philippines. He was the Steersman in the 1997 production of Richard Wagner's opera, The Flying Dutchman, in Taipei, Taiwan. He was also Rodolfo in Puccini's opera, La Boheme, in a 1997 Taipei production, a role he reprised in 1999.

In 2000, Armando Chin was performing in solo concerts in Taiwan again. He performed at the Esplanade Concert Hall in Singapore in 2003. He sang for former Malaysian Prime Minister Abdullah Ahmad Badawi at a banquet in 2004, and was highly praised by the Prime Minister.

In January 2005, Armando Chin sang in a Chinese-language opera Lei Yu staged in Singapore's Esplanade Concert Hall. His April 2005 vocal recital at Xi'an, China was highly lauded not only by the public and the students of Xi'an Conservatory of Music, but also by the professors of music and singing of China. In 2008, he was actively involved in fund-raising concerts for the Sichuan earthquake fund.

But for his untimely death, Armando Chin had planned a return to the opera stage in Paris and Vienna in 2011.

== Competition Prizes ==
1st Prize, Southeast Asian Singing Competition 1984

1st runner-up, 6° Concorso Internazionale di Canto "Ismaele Voltolini" (6th Ismaele Voltolini International Singing Contest) in Mantua, Italy, from 8 to 13 September 1986.

2nd Prize (tied, no 1st prize awarded), 1° Concurso Internacional de Canto de Bilbao (1st Bilbao International Singing Competition) from 29 November to 6 December 1986 in Bilbao, Spain.

Diploma di Merito, Concorso Internazionale per Pianisti e Cantanti Lirici "Francesco Paolo Neglia" (Diploma of Merit, Francesco Paolo Neglia International Competition for Pianists and Singers) on 12 July 1987, Enna, Italy.

2. Preis, 8. Internationale Hans Gabor Belvedere Gesangswettbewerb (2nd Prize, 8th International Hans Gabor Belvedere Singing Competition), 1989 in Vienna.

1. Preis, Förderungspreis für junge Opernsänger (1st Prize, Scholarship Prize for Young Opera Singers) on 1 July 1989 in Vienna, Austria.

== Choral Associations ==
Armando Chin Yong was the Vice-President of the Yin Qi Music Centre Sdn Bhd in Kuala Lumpur which runs the Yin Qi Christian Choir, a non-denominational choir specialising in large sacred works. Armando Chin Yong was a guest soloist in several of their productions.

He also trained seven of the singers in Malaysia's chamber choir, Cantus Musicus, including its Music Director, Lisa Ho and its Assistant Choral Director, Timothy Ooi. Maestro Chin was to have had further singing collaborations with Cantus Musicus in 2011 and 2012.
