= List of number-one country albums of 2009 (Australia) =

ARIA Charts number-one country albums of 2009 < 2008 2010 >

Other Australian number-one charts of 2009
- albums
- singles
- urban singles
- dance singles
- club tracks
- digital tracks

Top Australian singles and albums of 2009
- Triple J Hottest 100
- top 25 singles
- top 25 albums

These are the Australian Country number-one albums of 2009, per the ARIA Charts.

Issue date	Album	Artist
5 January	Rattlin' Bones	Kasey Chambers & Shane Nicholson
12 January	Fearless	Taylor Swift
19 January	Fearless	Taylor Swift
26 January	Fearless	Taylor Swift
2 February	Fearless	Taylor Swift
9 February	Fearless	Taylor Swift
16 February	Fearless	Taylor Swift
23 February	Fearless	Taylor Swift
2 March	Fearless	Taylor Swift
9 March	Fearless	Taylor Swift
16 March	Fearless	Taylor Swift
23 March	Fearless	Taylor Swift
30 March	Fearless	Taylor Swift
6 April	Fearless	Taylor Swift
13 April	Fearless	Taylor Swift
20 April	Fearless	Taylor Swift
27 April	Fearless	Taylor Swift
4 May	Fearless	Taylor Swift
11 May	Fearless	Taylor Swift
18 May	Fearless	Taylor Swift
25 May	Fearless	Taylor Swift
1 June	Fearless	Taylor Swift
8 June	Fearless	Taylor Swift
15 June	Fearless	Taylor Swift
22 June	Fearless	Taylor Swift
29 June	Fearless	Taylor Swift
6 July	Fearless	Taylor Swift
13 July	Fearless	Taylor Swift
20 July	Fearless	Taylor Swift
27 July	Fearless	Taylor Swift
3 August	Fearless	Taylor Swift
10 August	Fearless	Taylor Swift
17 August	Fearless	Taylor Swift
24 August	Fearless	Taylor Swift
31 August	Fearless	Taylor Swift
7 September	Fearless	Taylor Swift
14 September	Fearless	Taylor Swift
21 September	Fearless	Taylor Swift
28 September	Fearless	Taylor Swift
5 October	Fearless	Taylor Swift
12 October	Fearless	Taylor Swift
19 October	Fearless	Taylor Swift
26 October	Fearless	Taylor Swift
2 November	Fearless	Taylor Swift
9 November	Fearless	Taylor Swift
16 November	Planet Country	Lee Kernaghan
23 November	Fearless	Taylor Swift
30 November	Fearless	Taylor Swift
7 December	Fearless	Taylor Swift
14 December	Fearless	Taylor Swift
21 December	Fearless	Taylor Swift
28 December	Fearless	Taylor Swift

== See also ==
- 2009 in music
- List of number-one albums of 2009 (Australia)
