= List of number-one urban albums of 2010 (Australia) =

ARIA Charts number-one urban albums of 2010 < 2009 2011 >

Other Australian number-one charts of 2010
- albums
- singles
- urban singles
- dance singles
- club tracks
- digital tracks

Top Australian singles and albums of 2010
- Triple J Hottest 100
- top 25 singles
- top 25 albums

This is a list of albums that reached number-one on the ARIA Urban Albums Chart in 2010. The ARIA Urban Albums Chart is a weekly chart that ranks the best-performing urban albums in Australia. It is published by the Australian Recording Industry Association (ARIA), an organisation that collects music data for the weekly ARIA Charts. To be eligible to appear on the chart, the recording must be an album of a predominantly urban nature.

== Chart history ==
Issue date	Album	Artist(s)	Reference
4 January	The E.N.D	The Black Eyed Peas	
11 January	The E.N.D	The Black Eyed Peas	
18 January	The E.N.D	The Black Eyed Peas	
25 January	The E.N.D	The Black Eyed Peas	
1 February	The E.N.D	The Black Eyed Peas	
8 February	The E.N.D	The Black Eyed Peas	
15 February	Blazin' 2010	Various Artists	
22 February	The E.N.D	The Black Eyed Peas	
1 March	The E.N.D	The Black Eyed Peas	
8 March	The E.N.D	The Black Eyed Peas	
15 March	Plastic Beach	Gorillaz	
22 March	Plastic Beach	Gorillaz	
29 March	Plastic Beach	Gorillaz	
5 April	Plastic Beach	Gorillaz	
12 April	Raymond v. Raymond	Usher	
19 April	Raymond v. Raymond	Usher	
26 April	Raymond v. Raymond	Usher	
3 May	Raymond v. Raymond	Usher	
10 May	Essential R&B 2010	Various Artists	
17 May	Raymond v. Raymond	Usher	
24 May	Raymond v. Raymond	Usher	
31 May	Raymond v. Raymond	Usher	
7 June	Raymond v. Raymond	Usher	
14 June	Raymond v. Raymond	Usher	
21 June	Raymond v. Raymond	Usher	
28 June	Recovery	Eminem	
5 July	Recovery	Eminem	
12 July	Recovery	Eminem	
19 July	Recovery	Eminem	
26 July	Recovery	Eminem	
2 August	Recovery	Eminem	
9 August	Running on Air	Bliss n Eso	
16 August	Recovery	Eminem	
23 August	Recovery	Eminem	
30 August	Recovery	Eminem	
6 September	Recovery	Eminem	
13 September	Recovery	Eminem	
20 September	Recovery	Eminem	
27 September	Recovery	Eminem	
4 October	Recovery	Eminem	
11 October	Recovery	Eminem	
18 October	Recovery	Eminem	
25 October	Recovery	Eminem	
1 November	Doo-Wops & Hooligans	Bruno Mars	
8 November	Crave Vol. 5 – Mixed by DJ Havana Brown	Various Artists	
15 November	Get 'Em Girls	Jessica Mauboy	
22 November	Loud	Rihanna	
29 November	Loud	Rihanna	
6 December	Loud	Rihanna	
13 December	Loud	Rihanna	
20 December	The Beginning	The Black Eyed Peas	
27 December	The Beginning	The Black Eyed Peas	

== See also ==
- 2010 in music
- List of number-one albums of 2010 (Australia)
