= List of number-one country albums of 2010 (Australia) =

ARIA Charts number-one country albums of 2010 < 2009 2011 >

Other Australian number-one charts of 2010
- albums
- singles
- urban singles
- dance singles
- club tracks
- digital tracks

Top Australian singles and albums of 2010
- Triple J Hottest 100
- top 25 singles
- top 25 albums

These are the Australian Country number-one albums of 2010, per the ARIA Charts.

| Issue date | Album | Artist |
|---|---|---|
| 4 January | Fearless | Taylor Swift |
| 11 January | Fearless | Taylor Swift |
| 18 January | Fearless | Taylor Swift |
| 25 January | Wrapped Up Good | The McClymonts |
| 1 February | Wrapped Up Good | The McClymonts |
| 8 February | Fearless | Taylor Swift |
| 15 February | Fearless | Taylor Swift |
| 22 February | Fearless | Taylor Swift |
| 1 March | Fearless | Taylor Swift |
| 8 March | Fearless | Taylor Swift |
| 15 March | Fearless | Taylor Swift |
| 22 March | Fearless | Taylor Swift |
| 29 March | Fearless | Taylor Swift |
| 5 April | Fearless | Taylor Swift |
| 12 April | Fearless | Taylor Swift |
| 19 April | Fearless | Taylor Swift |
| 26 April | Fearless | Taylor Swift |
| 3 May | Fearless | Taylor Swift |
| 10 May | Fearless | Taylor Swift |
| 17 May | Fearless | Taylor Swift |
| 24 May | Calling Me Home | Sara Storer |
| 31 May | Fearless | Taylor Swift |
| 7 June | Need You Now | Lady Antebellum |
| 14 June | Need You Now | Lady Antebellum |
| 21 June | Need You Now | Lady Antebellum |
| 28 June | Need You Now | Lady Antebellum |
| 5 July | Need You Now | Lady Antebellum |
| 12 July | Need You Now | Lady Antebellum |
| 19 July | Need You Now | Lady Antebellum |
| 26 July | Double Cream: The Best of Cream of Country Volume 2 | Various artists |
| 2 August | Need You Now | Lady Antebellum |
| 9 August | Need You Now | Lady Antebellum |
| 16 August | Need You Now | Lady Antebellum |
| 23 August | Need You Now | Lady Antebellum |
| 30 August | It Going To Be Ok | Adam Brand |
| 6 September | The Essential | Dixie Chicks |
| 13 September | Need You Now | Lady Antebellum |
| 20 September | Need You Now | Lady Antebellum |
| 27 September | Little Bird | Kasey Chambers |
| 4 October | Little Bird | Kasey Chambers |
| 11 October | Little Bird | Kasey Chambers |
| 18 October | Little Bird | Kasey Chambers |
| 25 October | Little Bird | Kasey Chambers |
| 1 November | Little Bird | Kasey Chambers |
| 8 November | Speak Now | Taylor Swift |
| 15 November | Speak Now | Taylor Swift |
| 22 November | Speak Now | Taylor Swift |
| 29 November | Speak Now | Taylor Swift |
| 6 December | Speak Now | Taylor Swift |
| 13 December | Speak Now | Taylor Swift |
| 20 December | Speak Now | Taylor Swift |
| 27 December | Speak Now | Taylor Swift |

== See also ==
- 2010 in music
- List of number-one albums of 2010 (Australia)
