= List of number-one digital albums of 2010 (Australia) =

ARIA Charts number-one digital albums of 2010 < 2009 2011 >

Other Australian number-one charts of 2010
- albums
- singles
- urban singles
- dance singles
- club tracks
- digital tracks

Top Australian singles and albums of 2010
- Triple J Hottest 100
- top 25 singles
- top 25 albums

The ARIA Albums Chart ranks the best-performing albums and extended plays (EPs) in Australia. Its data, published by the Australian Recording Industry Association, is based collectively on the weekly digital sales of albums and EPs.

== Chart history ==
Date	Album	Artist(s)	Ref.
4 January	Sigh No More	Mumford & Sons	
11 January	Sigh No More	Mumford & Sons	
18 January	Contra	Vampire Weekend	
25 January	Animal	Kesha	
1 February	Sigh No More	Mumford & Sons	
8 February	Hope for Haiti	Various Artists	
15 February	Sigh No More	Mumford & Sons	
22 February	Soldier of Love	Sade	
1 March	Sigh No More	Mumford & Sons	
8 March	Sigh No More	Mumford & Sons	
15 March	Plastic Beach	Gorillaz	
22 March	Down the Way	Angus & Julia Stone	
29 March	Down the Way	Angus & Julia Stone	
5 April	April Uprising	John Butler Trio	
12 April	Slash	Slash	
19 April	Congratulations	MGMT	
26 April	Platinum	INXS	
3 May	Platinum	INXS	
10 May	Golden Rule	Powderfinger	
17 May	Glee: The Music, The Power of Madonna	Glee Cast	
24 May	This Is the Warning	Dead Letter Circus	
31 May	Glee: The Music, Volume 3 Showstoppers	Glee Cast	
7 June	Glee: The Music, Volume 3 Showstoppers	Glee Cast	
14 June	To the Sea	Jack Johnson	
21 June	To the Sea	Jack Johnson	
28 June	Recovery	Eminem	
5 July	Recovery	Eminem	
12 July	Aphrodite	Kylie Minogue	
19 July	Recovery	Eminem	
26 July	Recovery	Eminem	
2 August	Birds of Tokyo	Birds of Tokyo	
9 August	Running on Air	Bliss n Eso	
16 August	Lungs	Florence and the Machine	
23 August	Recovery	Eminem	
30 August	Recovery	Eminem	
6 September	Asylum	Disturbed	
13 September	Teenage Dream	Katy Perry	
20 September	A Thousand Suns	Linkin Park	
27 September	A Thousand Suns	Linkin Park	
4 October	Record Collection	Mark Ronson	
11 October	Bag Raiders	Bag Raiders	
18 October	Flags	Brooke Fraser	
25 October	Come Around Sundown	Kings of Leon	
1 November	Come Around Sundown	Kings of Leon	
8 November	Speak Now	Taylor Swift	
15 November	Down the Way	Angus & Julia Stone	
22 November	Greatest Hits... So Far!!!	Pink	
29 November	My Beautiful Dark Twisted Fantasy	Kanye West	
6 December	Volume 4	Glee Cast	
13 December	My Beautiful Dark Twisted Fantasy	Kanye West	
20 December	Greatest Hits	Bon Jovi	
27 December	Greatest Hits	Bon Jovi	

== Number-one artists ==
Position	Artist	Weeks at No. 1
1	Eminem	6
1	Mumford & Sons	6
2	Glee Cast	4
3	Angus Stone & Julia Stone	3
3	Bon Jovi	2
4	INXS	2
4	Jack Johnson	2
4	Kanye West	2
4	Kings of Leon	2
4	Linkin Park	2
5	Birds of Tokyo	1
5	Bliss n Eso	1
5	Brooke Fraser	1
5	Dead Letter Circus	1
5	Disturbed	1
5	Florence and the Machine	1
5	Gorillaz	1
5	John Butler Trio	1
5	Katy Perry	1
5	Kesha	1
5	Kylie Minogue	1
5	Mark Ronson	1
5	MGMT	1
5	Pink	1
5	Powderfinger	1
5	Sade	1
5	Slash	1
5	Taylor Swift	1
5	Vampire Weekend	1

== See also ==
- 2010 in music
- ARIA Charts
- List of number-one singles of 2010 (Australia)
