= List of number-one digital albums of 2009 (Australia) =

ARIA Charts number-one digital albums of 2009 < 2008 2010 >

Other Australian number-one charts of 2009
- albums
- singles
- urban singles
- dance singles
- club tracks
- digital tracks

Top Australian singles and albums of 2009
- Triple J Hottest 100
- top 25 singles
- top 25 albums

The ARIA Albums Chart ranks the best-performing albums and extended plays (EPs) in Australia. Its data, published by the Australian Recording Industry Association, is based collectively on the weekly digital sales of albums and EPs.

== Chart history ==
Date	Album	Artist(s)	Ref.
16 November	Reality Killed the Video Star	Robbie Williams	
23 November	Golden Rule	Powderfinger	
30 November	Golden Rule	Powderfinger	
7 December	I Dreamed a Dream	Susan Boyle	
14 December	Glee: The Music, Volume 2	Glee Cast	
21 December	Glee: The Music, Volume 2	Glee Cast	
28 December	I Dreamed a Dream	Susan Boyle	

== See also ==
- 2009 in music
- ARIA Charts
- List of number-one singles of 2009 (Australia)
