= List of number-one urban albums of 2009 (Australia) =

ARIA Charts number-one urban albums of 2009 < 2008 2010 >

Other Australian number-one charts of 2009
- albums
- singles
- urban singles
- dance singles
- club tracks
- digital tracks

Top Australian singles and albums of 2009
- Triple J Hottest 100
- top 25 singles
- top 25 albums

This is a list of albums that reached number-one on the ARIA Urban Albums Chart in 2009. The ARIA Urban Albums Chart is a weekly chart that ranks the best-performing urban albums in Australia. It is published by the Australian Recording Industry Association (ARIA), an organisation that collects music data for the weekly ARIA Charts. To be eligible to appear on the chart, the recording must be an album of a predominantly urban nature.

== Chart history ==
Issue date	Album	Artist(s)	Reference
5 January	I Am... Sasha Fierce	Beyoncé	
12 January	I Am... Sasha Fierce	Beyoncé	
19 January	I Am... Sasha Fierce	Beyoncé	
26 January	I Am... Sasha Fierce	Beyoncé	
2 February	Blazin' 2009	Various Artists	
9 February	Blazin' 2009	Various Artists	
16 February	Blazin' 2009	Various Artists	
23 February	Blazin' 2009	Various Artists	
2 March	I Am... Sasha Fierce	Beyoncé	
9 March	I Am... Sasha Fierce	Beyoncé	
16 March	I Am... Sasha Fierce	Beyoncé	
23 March	I Am... Sasha Fierce	Beyoncé	
30 March	I Am... Sasha Fierce	Beyoncé	
6 April	I Am... Sasha Fierce	Beyoncé	
13 April	R.O.O.T.S.	Flo Rida	
20 April	R&B Superclub: Greatest Hits 2001–2009	Various Artists	
27 April	I Am... Sasha Fierce	Beyoncé	
4 May	I Am... Sasha Fierce	Beyoncé	
11 May	I Am... Sasha Fierce	Beyoncé	
18 May	I Am... Sasha Fierce	Beyoncé	
25 May	Relapse	Eminem	
1 June	Relapse	Eminem	
8 June	Relapse	Eminem	
15 June	The E.N.D	The Black Eyed Peas	
22 June	State of the Art	Hilltop Hoods	
29 June	State of the Art	Hilltop Hoods	
6 July	State of the Art	Hilltop Hoods	
13 July	The E.N.D	The Black Eyed Peas	
20 July	The E.N.D	The Black Eyed Peas	
27 July	The E.N.D	The Black Eyed Peas	
3 August	The E.N.D	The Black Eyed Peas	
10 August	The E.N.D	The Black Eyed Peas	
17 August	The E.N.D	The Black Eyed Peas	
24 August	The E.N.D	The Black Eyed Peas	
31 August	The E.N.D	The Black Eyed Peas	
7 September	The E.N.D	The Black Eyed Peas	
14 September	The E.N.D	The Black Eyed Peas	
21 September	The E.N.D	The Black Eyed Peas	
28 September	I Am... Sasha Fierce	Beyoncé	
5 October	The E.N.D	The Black Eyed Peas	
12 October	The E.N.D	The Black Eyed Peas	
19 October	The E.N.D	The Black Eyed Peas	
26 October	The E.N.D	The Black Eyed Peas	
2 November	The E.N.D	The Black Eyed Peas	
9 November	The E.N.D	The Black Eyed Peas	
16 November	The E.N.D	The Black Eyed Peas	
23 November	The E.N.D	The Black Eyed Peas	
30 November	The E.N.D	The Black Eyed Peas	
7 December	The E.N.D	The Black Eyed Peas	
14 December	The E.N.D	The Black Eyed Peas	
21 December	Introducing Stan Walker	Stan Walker	
28 December	The E.N.D	The Black Eyed Peas	

== See also ==
- 2009 in music
- List of number-one albums of 2009 (Australia)
