= Recollection (k.d. lang album) =

Greatest hits album by k.d. lang
- Released: 9 February 2010
- Genre: Country; Pop; soft rock
- Label: Warner Bros.

K.d. lang chronology
Watershed (2008)	Recollection (2010)	Sing It Loud (2011)

Alternative cover
- Double CD album cover

Recollection is a greatest hits album by k.d. lang. The album was released in 2010.

== Track listing ==
Single Disc Version

1. "Constant Craving" – 4:37
2. "Calling All Angels" – 5:17
3. "Crying" – 3:48
4. "Hallelujah" – 5:08
5. "Helpless" – 4:15
6. "What a Wonderful World" – 3:21
7. "Miss Chatelaine" – 3:50
8. "Golden Slumbers / The End" – 4:17
9. "Wash Me Clean" – 3:17
10. "Simple" – 2:44
11. "Pullin' Back the Reigns" – 4:22
12. "Black Coffee" – 3:17
13. "Beautifully Combined" – 2:44

Double Disc Version

Disc One

1. "Trail of Broken Hearts" – 3:24
2. "Constant Craving" – 4:37
3. "The Air That I Breathe" – 6:14
4. "Helpless" – 4:15
5. "You're Ok" – 3:02
6. "Western Stars" – 3:14
7. "The Valley" – 5:30
8. "Summerfling" – 3:51
9. "Miss Chatelaine" – 3:49
10. "I Dream of Spring" – 4:01
11. "Hallelujah" – 5:08

Disc Two

1. "Help Me" – 4:00
2. "Hush Sweet Lover" – 4:06
3. "Beautiful Combined" – 2:43
4. "Crying" – 3:48
5. "Love For Sale" – 5:26
6. "Golden Slumbers/The End" – 4:17
7. "Barefoot" – 4:17
8. "Moonglow" – 4:32
9. "So In Love" – 4:35
10. "Calling All Angels" – 5:17
11. "Hallelujah" (New Version) – 5:36

== Charts ==
=== Weekly charts ===
Chart (2010–11)	Peak position
Australian Albums (ARIA)	1
Canadian Albums (Billboard)	3
German Albums (Offizielle Top 100)	74
Greek Albums (IFPI)	13
Dutch Albums (Album Top 100)	97
New Zealand Albums (RMNZ)	2
Scottish Albums (OCC)	65
Swedish Albums (Sverigetopplistan)	53
UK Albums (OCC)	68
US Billboard 200	36

=== Year-end charts ===
Chart (2010)	Position
Australian Albums (ARIA)	14
Canadian Albums (Billboard)	50

=== Decade-end charts ===
Chart (2010–2019)	Position
Australian Albums (ARIA)	66

== Certifications ==
Region	Certification	Certified units/sales
Australia (ARIA)	2× Platinum	140,000^{^}
Canada (Music Canada)	2× Platinum	160,000^{^}
^{^} Shipments figures based on certification alone.

== See also ==
- List of number-one albums of 2010 (Australia)
