= List of top 25 albums for 2010 in Australia =

Top 25 albums of 2010 < 2009 2011 >

Other Australian top charts for 2010
- top 25 singles
- Triple J Hottest 100

Australian number-one charts of 2010
- albums
- singles
- urban singles
- dance singles
- club tracks
- digital tracks

The following lists the top 25 albums of 2010 in Australia from the Australian Recording Industry Association (ARIA) End of Year Albums Chart.

#	Title	Artist	Highest pos. reached	Weeks at No. 1
1.	Greatest Hits... So Far!!!	Pink	1	11 (Note: Greatest Hits... So Far!!! debuted at number one on the ARIA Albums Chart on 21 November 2010. It stayed at its peak position for ten consecutive weeks.)
2.	I Dreamed a Dream	Susan Boyle	1	11 (Note: I Dreamed a Dream debuted at number one on the ARIA Albums Chart on 29 November 2009. It stayed at its peak position for eleven consecutive weeks.)
3.	Recovery	Eminem	1	9 (Note: Recovery debuted at number one on the ARIA Albums Chart on 27 June 2010. It stayed at its peak position for six consecutive weeks, before moving to number two in its seventh week on the chart (8 August 2010). The next week it reclaimed the number one spot for three weeks.)
4.	Greatest Hits	Bon Jovi	1	1 (Note: Greatest Hits debuted at number on the ARIA Albums Chart on 14 November 2010. It stayed at its peak position for one week, and has since stayed in the top five as of 23 January 2011.)
5.	The Gift	Susan Boyle	2	
6.	The Fame Monster	Lady Gaga	1	3 (Note: The Fame Monster debuted at number six on the ARIA Albums Chart on 13 December 2009. It peaked at number one in its eighteenth week on the chart (11 April 2010), for three consecutive weeks.)
7.	Down the Way	Angus & Julia Stone	1	2 (Note: Down the Way debuted at number one on the ARIA Albums Chart on 21 March 2010, and stayed at its peak position for two consecutive weeks. It is the highest-selling album by an Australian artist, duo or group.)
8.	Sigh No More	Mumford & Sons	1	3 (Note: Sigh No More debuted at number four on the ARIA Albums Chart on 25 October 2009. It peaked at number one in its seventeenth week on the chart (14 February 2010), for three consecutive weeks.)
9.	Crazy Love	Michael Bublé	1	3 (Note: Crazy Love debuted at number one on the ARIA Albums Chart on 18 October 2009, and stayed at its peak position for three consecutive weeks.)
10.	Teenage Dream	Katy Perry	1	2 (Note: Teenage Dream debuted at number one on the ARIA Albums Chart on 5 September 2010, and stayed at its peak position for two consecutive weeks.)
11.	Animal	Kesha	4	
12.	My Worlds	Justin Bieber	1	2 (Note: My Worlds debuted at number one on the ARIA Albums Chart on 2 May 2010, before moving to number three the next week. In its fourth week on the chart (23 May 2010), it reclaimed the number one spot for one week.)
13.	Lungs	Florence and the Machine	3	
14.	Recollection	k.d. lang	1	3 (Note: Recollection debuted at number three on the ARIA Albums Chart on 21 February 2010. In its third week on the chart (7 March 2010), it moved up to number one, and stayed there for one week. In its twelfth week on the chart (9 May 2010), Recollection reclaimed the number one spot for two consecutive weeks.)
15.	Speak Now	Taylor Swift	1	1 (Note: Speak Now debuted at number one on the ARIA Albums Chart on 7 November 2010, and stayed at its peak position for one week.)
16.	Come Around Sundown	Kings of Leon	1	2 (Note: Come Around Sundown debuted at number one on the ARIA Albums Chart on 24 October 2010, and stayed at its peak position for two consecutive weeks.)
17	Fearless	Taylor Swift	2	
18	Duet	Ronan Keating	3	
19	Altiyan Childs	Altiyan Childs	3	
20	April Uprising	John Butler Trio	1	1 (Note: April Uprising debuted at number one on the ARIA Albums Chart on 4 April 2010, and stayed at its peak position for one week.)
21	Glee: The Music, Volume 4	Glee cast	3	
22	Raymond v. Raymond	Usher	2	
23	Loud	Rihanna	3	
24	Birds of Tokyo	Birds of Tokyo	2	
25	Jason Derülo	Jason Derulo	4	

Peak chart positions from 2010 are from the ARIA Charts, overall position on the End of Year Chart is calculated by the ARIA, based on the number of weeks and position that the records reach within the Top 100 albums chart for each week during 2010.
