= List of number-one dance singles of 2009 (Australia) =

ARIA Charts number-one dance singles of 2009 < 2008 2010 >

Other Australian number-one charts of 2009
- albums
- singles
- urban singles
- club tracks
- digital tracks

Top Australian singles and albums of 2009
- Triple J Hottest 100
- top 25 singles
- top 25 albums

The ARIA Dance Chart is a chart that ranks the best-performing dance singles of Australia. It is published by Australian Recording Industry Association (ARIA), an organisation who collect music data for the weekly ARIA Charts. To be eligible to appear on the chart, the recording must be a single, and be "predominantly of a dance nature, or with a featured track of a dance nature, or included in the ARIA Club Chart or a comparable overseas chart".

== Chart history ==
Issue date	Song	Artist(s)	Reference
5 January	"Poker Face"	Lady Gaga	
12 January	"Poker Face"	Lady Gaga	
19 January	"Poker Face"	Lady Gaga	
26 January	"Get Shaky"	The Ian Carey Project	
2 February	"Get Shaky"	The Ian Carey Project	
9 February	"Get Shaky"	The Ian Carey Project	
16 February	"Get Shaky"	The Ian Carey Project	
23 February	"Get Shaky"	The Ian Carey Project	
2 March	"Get Shaky"	The Ian Carey Project	
9 March	"Get Shaky"	The Ian Carey Project	
16 March	"Get Shaky"	The Ian Carey Project	
23 March	"Get Shaky"	The Ian Carey Project	
30 March	"Poker Face"	Lady Gaga	
6 April	"Poker Face"	Lady Gaga	
13 April	"LoveGame"	Lady Gaga	
20 April	"LoveGame"	Lady Gaga	
27 April	"LoveGame"	Lady Gaga	
4 May	"LoveGame"	Lady Gaga	
11 May	"LoveGame"	Lady Gaga	
18 May	"LoveGame"	Lady Gaga	
25 May	"LoveGame"	Lady Gaga	
1 June	"LoveGame"	Lady Gaga	
8 June	"LoveGame"	Lady Gaga	
15 June	"I Gotta Feeling"	The Black Eyed Peas	
22 June	"I Gotta Feeling"	The Black Eyed Peas	
29 June	"I Gotta Feeling"	The Black Eyed Peas	
6 July	"I Gotta Feeling"	The Black Eyed Peas	
13 July	"I Gotta Feeling"	The Black Eyed Peas	
20 July	"I Gotta Feeling"	The Black Eyed Peas	
27 July	"I Gotta Feeling"	The Black Eyed Peas	
3 August	"I Gotta Feeling"	The Black Eyed Peas	
10 August	"I Gotta Feeling"	The Black Eyed Peas	
17 August	"Sexy Bitch"	David Guetta featuring Akon	
24 August	"Sexy Bitch"	David Guetta featuring Akon	
31 August	"Sexy Bitch"	David Guetta featuring Akon	
7 September	"Sexy Bitch"	David Guetta featuring Akon	
14 September	"Sexy Bitch"	David Guetta featuring Akon	
21 September	"Sexy Bitch"	David Guetta featuring Akon	
28 September	"Sexy Bitch"	David Guetta featuring Akon	
5 October	"Sexy Bitch"	David Guetta featuring Akon	
12 October	"Sexy Bitch"	David Guetta featuring Akon	
19 October	"Sexy Bitch"	David Guetta featuring Akon	
26 October	"Sexy Bitch"	David Guetta featuring Akon	
2 November	"Sexy Bitch"	David Guetta featuring Akon	
9 November	"Tik Tok"	Kesha	
16 November	"Tik Tok"	Kesha	
23 November	"Tik Tok"	Kesha	
30 November	"Tik Tok"	Kesha	
7 December	"Tik Tok"	Kesha	
14 December	"Tik Tok"	Kesha	
21 December	"Tik Tok"	Kesha	
28 December	"Tik Tok"	Kesha	

== Number-one artists ==
Position	Artist	Weeks at No. 1
1	Lady Gaga	14
2	David Guetta	12
3	The Black Eyed Peas	9
3	The Ian Carey Project	9
4	Kesha	8

== See also ==
- 2009 in music
- List of number-one singles of 2009 (Australia)
- List of number-one club tracks of 2009 (Australia)
