= List of number-one singles of 2010 (Australia) =

ARIA Charts number-one singles of 2010 < 2009 2011 >

Other Australian number-one charts of 2010
- albums
- urban singles
- dance singles
- club tracks
- digital tracks

Top Australian singles and albums of 2010
- Triple J Hottest 100
- top 25 singles
- top 25 albums

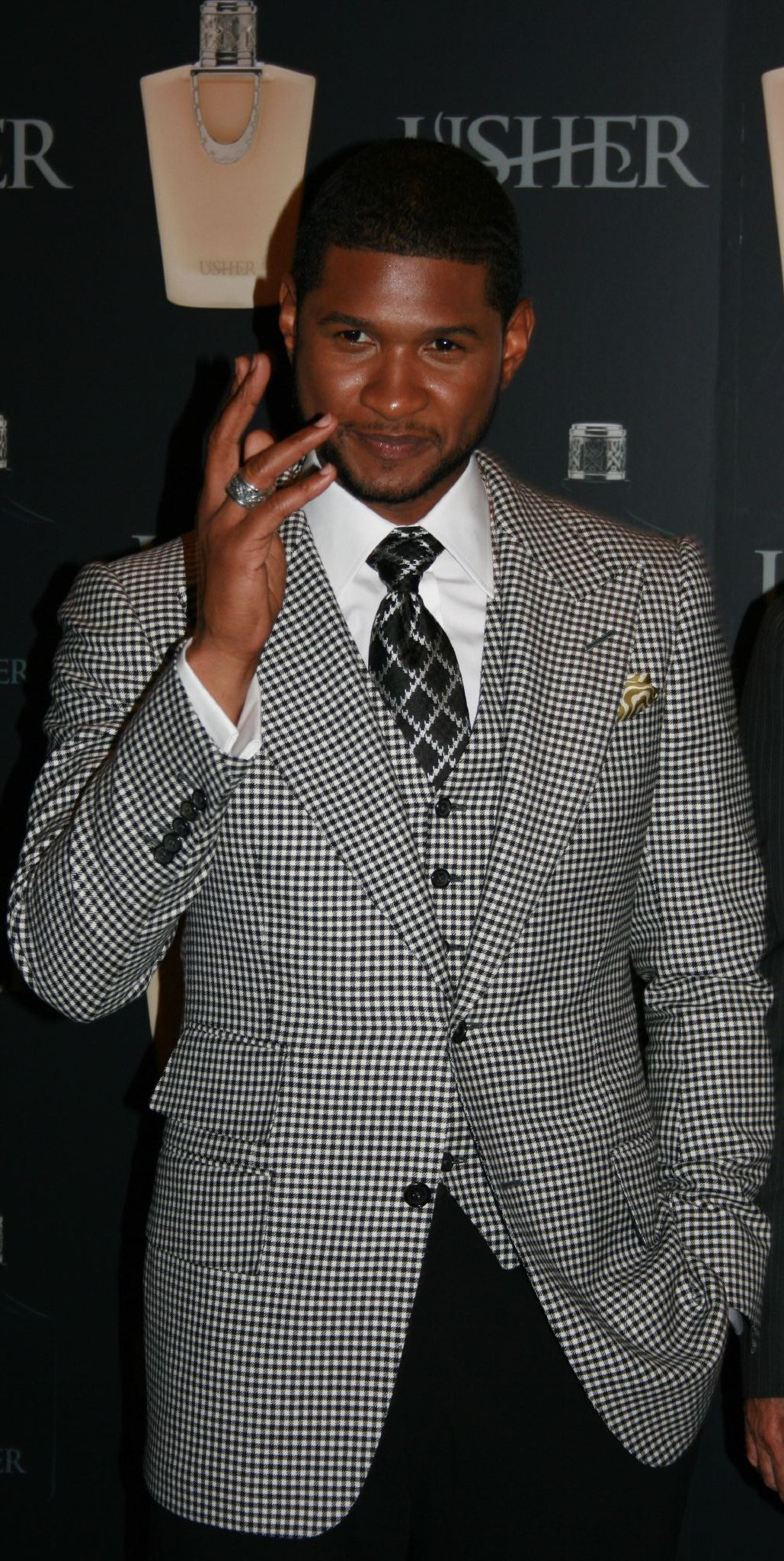
Usher's "OMG" was one of the longest-running number-one singles of 2010, having topped the ARIA Singles Chart for six consecutive weeks.

The ARIA Singles Chart ranks the best-performing singles in Australia. Its data, published by the Australian Recording Industry Association, is based collectively on each single's weekly physical and digital sales. In 2010, 17 singles claimed the top spot. Nine acts achieved their first number-one single in Australia, either as a lead or featured artist: Owl City, Iyaz, Jason Derulo, Train, Kevin Rudolf, will.i.am, Taio Cruz, Bruno Mars and Eve. Five collaborations topped the chart. Rihanna earned three number-one singles during the year for "Rude Boy", "Only Girl (In the World)" and "Love the Way You Lie". Mars earned two number-one singles for "Just the Way You Are" and "Grenade".

Usher's "OMG" and Eminem's "Love the Way You Lie" were the longest-running number-one singles of 2010, having each topped the ARIA Singles Chart for six consecutive weeks. Owl City's "Fireflies" topped the chart for five consecutive weeks, while Train's "Hey, Soul Sister", Katy Perry's "California Gurls", Cruz's "Dynamite", and Rihanna's "Only Girl (In the World)" each spent four weeks at the number-one spot.

== Chart history ==
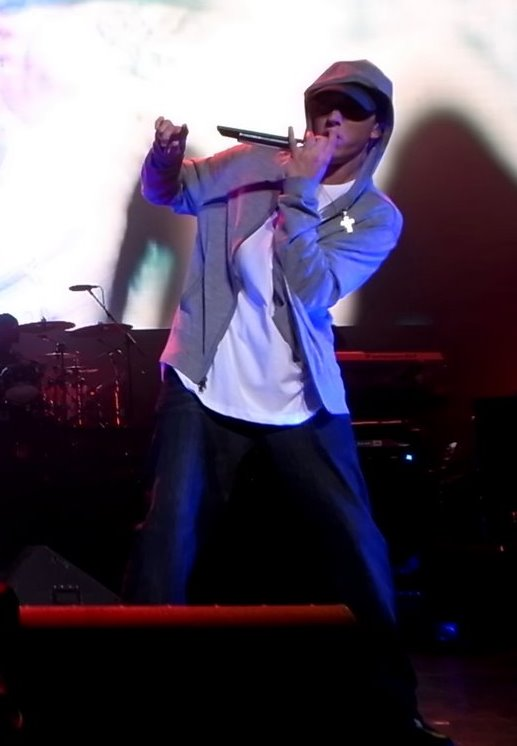
Eminem's "Love the Way You Lie" was one of the longest-running number-one singles of 2010, having topped the ARIA Singles Chart for six consecutive weeks.

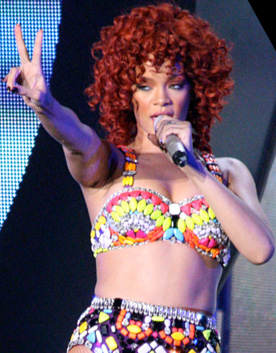
Rihanna earned three number-one singles during the year for "Rude Boy", "Only Girl (In the World)" and "Love the Way You Lie".

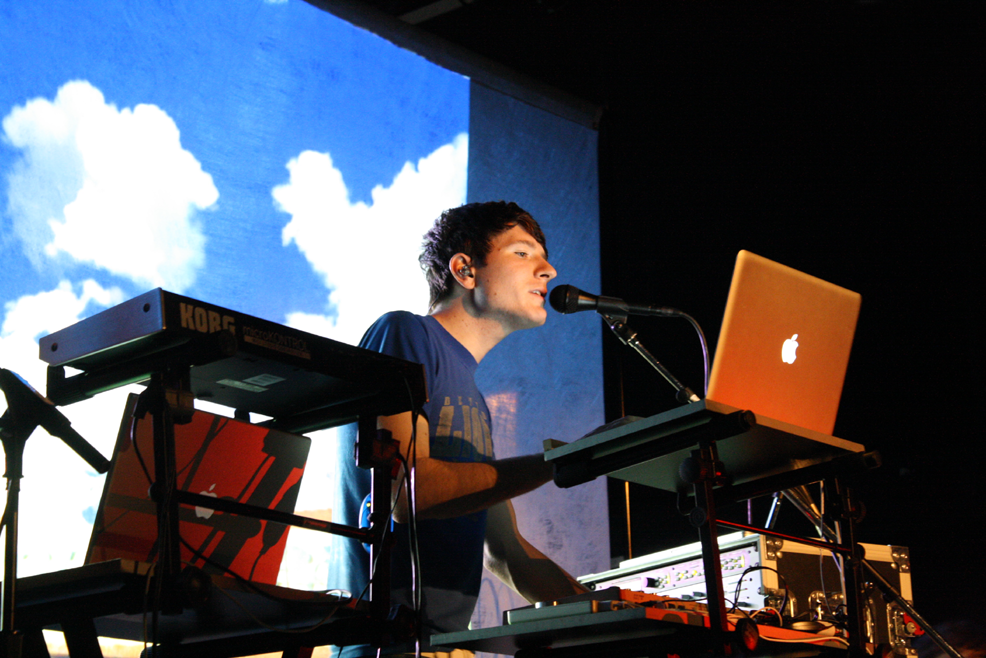
Owl City's "Fireflies" topped the ARIA Singles Chart for five consecutive weeks, becoming his first number-one single on the chart.

Key
The yellow background indicates the #1 song on ARIA's End of Year Singles Chart of 2010.

Date	Song	Artist(s)	Ref.
4 January	"Fireflies"	Owl City	
11 January	"Fireflies"	Owl City	
18 January	"Fireflies"	Owl City	
25 January	"Fireflies"	Owl City	
1 February	"Fireflies"	Owl City	
8 February	"Replay"	Iyaz	
15 February	"Replay"	Iyaz	
22 February	"In My Head"	Jason Derulo	
1 March	"In My Head"	Jason Derulo	
8 March	"Rude Boy"	Rihanna	
15 March	"Rude Boy"	Rihanna	
22 March	"Hey, Soul Sister"	Train	
29 March	"Hey, Soul Sister"	Train	
5 April	"Hey, Soul Sister"	Train	
12 April	"Hey, Soul Sister"	Train	
19 April	"Just Say So"	Brian McFadden featuring Kevin Rudolf	
26 April	"Just Say So"	Brian McFadden featuring Kevin Rudolf	
3 May	"Just Say So"	Brian McFadden featuring Kevin Rudolf	
10 May	"OMG"	Usher featuring will.i.am	
17 May	"OMG"	Usher featuring will.i.am	
24 May	"OMG"	Usher featuring will.i.am	
31 May	"OMG"	Usher featuring will.i.am	
7 June	"OMG"	Usher featuring will.i.am	
14 June	"OMG"	Usher featuring will.i.am	
21 June	"California Gurls"	Katy Perry featuring Snoop Dogg	
28 June	"California Gurls"	Katy Perry featuring Snoop Dogg	
5 July	"California Gurls"	Katy Perry featuring Snoop Dogg	
12 July	"California Gurls"	Katy Perry featuring Snoop Dogg	
19 July	"Love the Way You Lie"	Eminem featuring Rihanna	
26 July	"Love the Way You Lie"	Eminem featuring Rihanna	
2 August	"Love the Way You Lie"	Eminem featuring Rihanna	
9 August	"Love the Way You Lie"	Eminem featuring Rihanna	
16 August	"Love the Way You Lie"	Eminem featuring Rihanna	
23 August	"Love the Way You Lie"	Eminem featuring Rihanna	
30 August	"Dynamite"	Taio Cruz	
6 September	"Dynamite"	Taio Cruz	
13 September	"Dynamite"	Taio Cruz	
20 September	"Dynamite"	Taio Cruz	
27 September	"Only Girl (In the World)"	Rihanna	
4 October	"Only Girl (In the World)"	Rihanna	
11 October	"Only Girl (In the World)"	Rihanna	
18 October	"Raise Your Glass"	Pink	
25 October	"Just the Way You Are"	Bruno Mars	
1 November	"Only Girl (In the World)"	Rihanna	
8 November	"We R Who We R"	Kesha	
15 November	"We R Who We R"	Kesha	
22 November	"The Time (Dirty Bit)"	The Black Eyed Peas	
29 November	"We R Who We R"	Kesha	
6 December	"The Time (Dirty Bit)"	The Black Eyed Peas	
13 December	"Grenade"	Bruno Mars	
20 December	"Grenade"	Bruno Mars	
27 December	"Who's That Girl"	Guy Sebastian featuring Eve	

== Number-one artists ==
Position	Artist	Weeks at No. 1
1	Rihanna	12
2	Usher	6
2	will.i.am (as featuring)	6
2	Eminem	6
3	Owl City	5
4	Katy Perry	4
4	Snoop Dogg (as featuring)	4
4	Train	4
4	Taio Cruz	4
5	Brian McFadden	3
5	Kevin Rudolf (as featuring)	3
5	Bruno Mars	3
5	Kesha	3
6	Iyaz	2
6	Jason Derulo	2
6	The Black Eyed Peas	2
7	Pink	1
7	Guy Sebastian	1
7	Eve (as featuring)	1

== See also ==
- 2010 in music
- List of number-one albums of 2010 (Australia)
- List of top 25 singles for 2010 in Australia
- List of top 10 singles in 2010 (Australia)
