= List of top 25 albums for 2009 in Australia =

Top 25 albums of 2009 < 2008 2010 >

Other Australian top charts for 2009
- top 25 singles
- Triple J Hottest 100

Australian number-one charts of 2009
- albums
- singles
- urban singles
- dance singles
- club tracks
- digital tracks

These are the top 25 albums of 2009 in Australia from the Australian Recording Industry Association (ARIA) End of Year Albums Chart.

#	Title	Artist	Highest pos. reached	Weeks at No. 1
1.	I Dreamed a Dream	Susan Boyle	1	11 (Note: I Dreamed a Dream debuted at #1 on the ARIA Top 50 in December 2009 for four weeks, and continued into January and February 2010. As of week ending 14 February 2010, it is still #1.)
2.	Funhouse	Pink	1	9 (Note: Funhouse debuted at #1 on the ARIA Top 50 charts in November 2008, for a total stay of nine weeks. It was still #1 for the first week of 2009 and, as from February 2010, has continuously remained in the top 20 for 67 weeks.)
3.	The E.N.D.	The Black Eyed Peas	1	3 (Note: The E.N.D. debuted at #1 on the ARIA Top 50 charts in June 2009 for a week, it returned to #1 for a total of three separate weeks. As of February 2010, it has continuously remained in the top 10 for 35 weeks.)
4.	Fearless	Taylor Swift	2	
5.	It's Not Me, It's You	Lily Allen	1	3 (Note: It's Not Me, It's You debuted at #1 in late February 2009 for two weeks, it returned to #1 in April. As of February 2010, it has continuously remained in the Top 50 for 52 weeks.)
6.	Crazy Love	Michael Bublé	1	3 (Note: Crazy Love debuted at #1 in late October 2009 for three weeks. As of February 2010, it has continuously remained in the Top 10 for 17 weeks.)
7.	Only by the Night	Kings of Leon	1	14 (Note: Only By the Night peaked at #1 in October 2008 for four weeks, it returned to #1 for six weeks from January 2009 and again for four more weeks from late March. As of January 2010, it has been in the Top 50 for a total of 62 weeks.)
8.	The Essential Michael Jackson	Michael Jackson	1	7 (Note: The Essential Michael Jackson peaked at #12 in August 2005 and re-entered the Top 50 five more times, it peaked at #1 in July 2009 for seven weeks. It had been in the Top 50 for a total of 40 weeks.)
9.	The Fame	Lady Gaga	3	
10.	I Am... Sasha Fierce	Beyoncé	3	
11.	Twilight	Soundtrack	2	
12.	State of the Art	Hilltop Hoods	1	2
13.	Number Ones	Michael Jackson	2	
14.	Cradlesong	Rob Thomas	3	
15.	Hannah Montana: The Movie	Miley Cyrus	6	
16.	Dark Horse	Nickelback	3	
17.	Relapse	Eminem	1	2
18.	Walking on a Dream	Empire of the Sun	1	3
19.	21st Century Breakdown	Green Day	2	
20.	Been Waiting	Jessica Mauboy	11	
21.	Greatest Hits	Foo Fighters	1	1
22.	My Dream – Mio Visione	Mark Vincent	2	
23.	Viva la Vida or Death and All His Friends	Coldplay	1	4 (Note: Viva La Vida debuted at #1 on the ARIA Top 50 in June 2008 for four weeks. It remained in the Top 50 for a total of 57 weeks.)
24.	I'm Not Dead	Pink	1	2 (Note: I'm Not Dead debuted at #9 on the ARIA Top 50 in April 2006, it peaked at #1 in October for one week and again in June 2007 for a second week. As from January 2010, it has been in the Top 50 for a total of 163 weeks.)
25.	The Resistance	Muse	1	1

Peak chart positions from 2009 are from the ARIA Charts, overall position on the End of Year Chart is calculated by ARIA based on the number of weeks and position that the records reach within the Top 100 albums for each week during 2009.
