= List of number-one dance singles of 2010 (Australia) =

ARIA Charts number-one dance singles of 2010 < 2009 2011 >

Other Australian number-one charts of 2010
- albums
- singles
- urban singles
- club tracks
- digital tracks

Top Australian singles and albums of 2010
- Triple J Hottest 100
- top 25 singles
- top 25 albums

The ARIA Dance Chart is a chart that ranks the best-performing dance singles of Australia. It is published by Australian Recording Industry Association (ARIA), an organisation who collect music data for the weekly ARIA Charts. To be eligible to appear on the chart, the recording must be a single, and be "predominantly of a dance nature, or with a featured track of a dance nature, or included in the ARIA Club Chart or a comparable overseas chart".

== Chart history ==
Issue date	Song	Artist(s)	Reference
4 January	"Tik Tok"	Kesha	
11 January	"Tik Tok"	Kesha	
18 January	"Tik Tok"	Kesha	
25 January	"Tik Tok"	Kesha	
1 February	"Tik Tok"	Kesha	
8 February	"Tik Tok"	Kesha	
15 February	"Memories"	David Guetta featuring Kid Cudi	
22 February	"Memories"	David Guetta featuring Kid Cudi	
1 March	"Memories"	David Guetta featuring Kid Cudi	
8 March	"Memories"	David Guetta featuring Kid Cudi	
15 March	"Memories"	David Guetta featuring Kid Cudi	
22 March	"Memories"	David Guetta featuring Kid Cudi	
29 March	"Telephone"	Lady Gaga featuring Beyoncé	
5 April	"Telephone"	Lady Gaga featuring Beyoncé	
12 April	"I like That"	Richard Vission & Static Revenger featuring Luciana	
19 April	"Just Say So"	Brian McFadden featuring Kevin Rudolf	
26 April	"Just Say So"	Brian McFadden featuring Kevin Rudolf	
3 May	"Just Say So"	Brian McFadden featuring Kevin Rudolf	
10 May	"Just Say So"	Brian McFadden featuring Kevin Rudolf	
17 May	"Just Say So"	Brian McFadden featuring Kevin Rudolf	
24 May	"We No Speak Americano"	Yolanda Be Cool & DCUP	
31 May	"We No Speak Americano"	Yolanda Be Cool & DCUP	
7 June	"We No Speak Americano"	Yolanda Be Cool & DCUP	
14 June	"We No Speak Americano"	Yolanda Be Cool & DCUP	
21 June	"We No Speak Americano"	Yolanda Be Cool & DCUP	
28 June	"We No Speak Americano"	Yolanda Be Cool & DCUP	
5 July	"I Like It"	Enrique Iglesias featuring Pitbull	
12 July	"I Like It"	Enrique Iglesias featuring Pitbull	
19 July	"I Like It"	Enrique Iglesias featuring Pitbull	
26 July	"I Like It"	Enrique Iglesias featuring Pitbull	
2 August	"I Like It"	Enrique Iglesias featuring Pitbull	
9 August	"I Like It"	Enrique Iglesias featuring Pitbull	
16 August	"I Like It"	Enrique Iglesias featuring Pitbull	
23 August	"I Like It"	Enrique Iglesias featuring Pitbull	
30 August	"I Like It"	Enrique Iglesias featuring Pitbull	
6 September	"I Like It"	Enrique Iglesias featuring Pitbull	
13 September	"I Like It"	Enrique Iglesias featuring Pitbull	
20 September	"I Like It"	Enrique Iglesias featuring Pitbull	
27 September	"I Like It"	Enrique Iglesias featuring Pitbull	
4 October	"Barbra Streisand"	Duck Sauce	
11 October	"Barbra Streisand"	Duck Sauce	
18 October	"Barbra Streisand"	Duck Sauce	
25 October	"Freefallin'"	Zoë Badwi	
1 November	"Like a G6"	Far East Movement featuring The Cataracs & Dev	
8 November	"Like a G6"	Far East Movement featuring The Cataracs & Dev	
15 November	"Like a G6"	Far East Movement featuring The Cataracs & Dev	
22 November	"Like a G6"	Far East Movement featuring The Cataracs & Dev	
29 November	"Like a G6"	Far East Movement featuring The Cataracs & Dev	
6 December	"Like a G6"	Far East Movement featuring The Cataracs & Dev	
13 December	"Like a G6"	Far East Movement featuring The Cataracs & Dev	
20 December	"Like a G6"	Far East Movement featuring The Cataracs & Dev	
27 December	"Who's That Chick?"	David Guetta featuring Rihanna	

== Number-one artists ==
Position	Artist	Weeks at No. 1
1	Enrique Iglesias	13
1	Pitbull (as featuring)	13
2	Far East Movement	8
2	Dev (as featuring)	8
2	The Cataracs (as featuring)	8
3	David Guetta	7
4	Kesha	6
4	Kid Cudi (as featuring)	6
4	Yolanda Be Cool	6
4	DCUP	6
5	Brian McFadden	5
5	Kevin Rudolf (as featuring)	5
6	Beyoncé (as featuring)	2
6	Duck Sauce	2
6	Lady Gaga	2
7	Luciana (as featuring)	1
7	Rihanna (as featuring)	1
7	Richard Vission	1
7	Static Revenger	1
7	Zoë Badwi	1

== See also ==
- 2010 in music
- List of number-one singles of 2010 (Australia)
- List of number-one club tracks of 2010 (Australia)
