= List of number-one club tracks of 2010 (Australia) =

ARIA Charts number-one club tracks of 2010 < 2009 2011 >

Other Australian number-one charts of 2010
- albums
- singles
- urban singles
- dance singles
- digital tracks

Top Australian singles and albums of 2010
- Triple J Hottest 100
- top 25 singles
- top 25 albums

This is the list of number-one hits on the ARIA Club Chart in 2010, compiled by the Australian Recording Industry Association (ARIA) from weekly DJ reports.

== 2010 ==
Date		Song	Artist(s)	Reference
January	18	"Out My Bitch"	T-Rek	
January	25	"Out My Bitch"	T-Rek	
February	1	"Out My Bitch"	T-Rek	
February	8	"Out My Bitch"	T-Rek	
February	15	"Filter Freak"	Denzal Park	
February	22	"Filter Freak"	Denzal Park	
March	1	"Filter Freak"	Denzal Park	
March	8	"Filter Freak"	Denzal Park	
March	15	"Filter Freak"	Denzal Park	
March	22	"Filter Freak"	Denzal Park	
March	29	"Filter Freak"	Denzal Park	
April	5	"Filter Freak"	Denzal Park	
April	12	"We No Speak Americano"	Yolanda Be Cool and DCUP	
April	19	"We No Speak Americano"	Yolanda Be Cool and DCUP	
April	26	"We No Speak Americano"	Yolanda Be Cool and DCUP	
May	3	"We No Speak Americano"	Yolanda Be Cool and DCUP	
May	10	"We No Speak Americano"	Yolanda Be Cool and DCUP	
May	17	"We No Speak Americano"	Yolanda Be Cool and DCUP	
May	24	"We No Speak Americano"	Yolanda Be Cool and DCUP	
May	31	"Hey Hey"	Dennis Ferrer	
June	7	"Hey Hey"	Dennis Ferrer	
June	14	"Ascension"	Denzal Park	
June	21	"Ascension"	Denzal Park	
June	28	"Elevated"	TV Rock and Tara McDonald	
July	5	"Elevated"	TV Rock and Tara McDonald	
July	12	"Elevated"	TV Rock and Tara McDonald	
July	19	"Gotta Make a Move"	Hook n Sling featuring Snob Scrilla	
July	26	"Gotta Make a Move"	Hook n Sling featuring Snob Scrilla	
August	2	"Gotta Make a Move"	Hook n Sling featuring Snob Scrilla	
August	9	"Gotta Make a Move"	Hook n Sling featuring Snob Scrilla	
August	16	"Phazing"	Dirty South featuring Rudy	
August	23	"Phazing"	Dirty South featuring Rudy	
August	30	"Phazing"	Dirty South featuring Rudy	
September	6	"Freefallin"	Zoe Badwi	
September	13	"Barbra Streisand"	Duck Sauce	
September	20	"Barbra Streisand"	Duck Sauce	
September	27	"Barbra Streisand"	Duck Sauce	
October	4	"Barbra Streisand"	Duck Sauce	
October	11	"Barbra Streisand"	Duck Sauce	
October	18	"Barbra Streisand"	Duck Sauce	
October	25	"Barbra Streisand"	Duck Sauce	
November	1	"Barbra Streisand"	Duck Sauce	
November	8	"Barbra Streisand"	Duck Sauce	
November	15	"Hello"	Martin Solveig and Dragonette	
November	22	"Hello"	Martin Solveig and Dragonette	
November	29	"Hello"	Martin Solveig and Dragonette	
December	6	"Hello"	Martin Solveig and Dragonette	
December	13	"Hello"	Martin Solveig and Dragonette	
December	20	"Hello"	Martin Solveig and Dragonette	
December	27	"Hello"	Martin Solveig and Dragonette	

== Number-one artists ==
Position	Artist	Weeks at No. 1
1	Denzal Park	10
2	Duck Sauce	9
3	Yolanda Be Cool	7
3	DCUP	7
3	Martin Solveig	7
4	Hook N Sling	4
4	T-Rek	4
5	TV Rock	3
5	Dirty South	3
6	Dennis Ferrer	2
7	Zoë Badwi	1

== See also ==
- ARIA Charts
- List of number-one singles of 2010 (Australia)
- List of number-one albums of 2010 (Australia)
- 2010 in music
