= List of number-one urban singles of 2010 (Australia) =

ARIA Charts number-one urban singles of 2010 < 2009 2011 >

Other Australian number-one charts of 2010
- albums
- singles
- dance singles
- club tracks
- digital tracks

Top Australian singles and albums of 2010
- Triple J Hottest 100
- top 25 singles
- top 25 albums

The ARIA Urban Chart is a chart that ranks the best-performing Urban tracks singles of Australia. It is published by Australian Recording Industry Association (ARIA), an organisation who collect music data for the weekly ARIA Charts. To be eligible to appear on the chart, the recording must be a single, and be "predominantly of a Urban nature."

== Chart history ==
Issue date	Song	Artist(s)	Reference
4 January	"Whatcha Say"	Jason Derulo	
11 January	"Empire State of Mind"	Jay-Z featuring Alicia Keys	
18 January	"Empire State of Mind"	Jay-Z featuring Alicia Keys	
25 January	"Replay"	Iyaz	
1 February	"Replay"	Iyaz	
8 February	"Replay"	Iyaz	
15 February	"Replay"	Iyaz	
22 February	"In My Head"	Jason Derulo	
1 March	"In My Head"	Jason Derulo	
8 March	"Rude Boy"	Rihanna	
15 March	"Rude Boy"	Rihanna	
22 March	"In My Head"	Jason Derulo	
29 March	"In My Head"	Jason Derulo	
5 April	"In My Head"	Jason Derulo	
12 April	"In My Head"	Jason Derulo	
19 April	"In My Head"	Jason Derulo	
26 April	"I Made It (Cash Money Heroes)"	Kevin Rudolf featuring Birdman, Jay Sean & Lil Wayne	
3 May	"OMG"	Usher featuring Will.I.Am	
10 May	"OMG"	Usher featuring Will.I.Am	
17 May	"OMG"	Usher featuring Will.I.Am	
24 May	"OMG"	Usher featuring Will.I.Am	
31 May	"OMG"	Usher featuring Will.I.Am	
7 June	"OMG"	Usher featuring Will.I.Am	
14 June	"OMG"	Usher featuring Will.I.Am	
21 June	"OMG"	Usher featuring Will.I.Am	
28 June	"OMG"	Usher featuring Will.I.Am	
5 July	"OMG"	Usher featuring Will.I.Am	
12 July	"Love the Way You Lie"	Eminem featuring Rihanna	
19 July	"Love the Way You Lie"	Eminem featuring Rihanna	
26 July	"Love the Way You Lie"	Eminem featuring Rihanna	
2 August	"Love the Way You Lie"	Eminem featuring Rihanna	
9 August	"Love the Way You Lie"	Eminem featuring Rihanna	
16 August	"Love the Way You Lie"	Eminem featuring Rihanna	
23 August	"Love the Way You Lie"	Eminem featuring Rihanna	
30 August	"Dynamite"	Taio Cruz	
6 September	"Dynamite"	Taio Cruz	
13 September	"Dynamite"	Taio Cruz	
20 September	"Dynamite"	Taio Cruz	
27 September	"Only Girl (In the World)"	Rihanna	
4 October	"Only Girl (In the World)"	Rihanna	
11 October	"Only Girl (In the World)"	Rihanna	
18 October	"Only Girl (In the World)"	Rihanna	
25 October	"Only Girl (In the World)"	Rihanna	
1 November	"Only Girl (In the World)"	Rihanna	
8 November	"Only Girl (In the World)"	Rihanna	
15 November	"Only Girl (In the World)"	Rihanna	
22 November	"The Time (Dirty Bit)"	The Black Eyed Peas	
29 November	"The Time (Dirty Bit)"	The Black Eyed Peas	
6 December	"The Time (Dirty Bit)"	The Black Eyed Peas	
13 December	"The Time (Dirty Bit)"	The Black Eyed Peas	
20 December	"Who's That Girl"	Guy Sebastian featuring Eve	
27 December	"Who's That Girl"	Guy Sebastian featuring Eve	

== Number-one artists ==
Position	Artist	Weeks at No. 1
1	Rihanna	17
2	Usher	10
2	Will.I.Am	10
3	Jason Derulo	8
4	Eminem	7
5	The Black Eyed Peas	4
5	Iyaz	4
5	Taio Cruz	4
6	Jay-Z	2
6	Alicia Keys	2
6	Eve	2
6	Guy Sebastian	2
7	Kevin Rudolf	1
7	Jay Sean	1
7	Lil Wayne	1
7	Birdman	1

== See also ==
- 2010 in music
- List of number-one singles of 2010 (Australia)
