= List of number-one digital tracks of 2009 (Australia) =

ARIA Charts number-one digital tracks of 2009 < 2008 2010 >

Other Australian number-one charts of 2009
- albums
- singles
- urban singles
- dance singles
- club tracks

Top Australian singles and albums of 2009
- Triple J Hottest 100
- top 25 singles
- top 25 albums

The ARIA Digital Track Chart ranks the best-performing digital tracks of Australia. It is published by Australian Recording Industry Association (ARIA), an organisation who collects music data for the weekly ARIA Charts. To be eligible to appear on the chart, the recording must be a single not an EP and only paid downloads counted from downloadable outlets.

== Chart history ==
Key
| † | Indicates number-one digital single of 2009 |

| Issue date | Song | Artist(s) | Reference |
|---|---|---|---|
| 5 January | "Poker Face" | Lady Gaga | |
| 12 January | "Burn" | Jessica Mauboy | |
| 19 January | "Burn" | Jessica Mauboy | |
| 26 January | "You Found Me" | The Fray | |
| 2 February | "You Found Me" | The Fray | |
| 9 February | "You Found Me" | The Fray | |
| 16 February | "You Found Me" | The Fray | |
| 23 February | "Right Round" | Flo Rida featuring Kesha | |
| 2 March | "Right Round" | Flo Rida featuring Kesha | |
| 9 March | "Right Round" | Flo Rida featuring Kesha | |
| 16 March | "Right Round" | Flo Rida featuring Kesha | |
| 23 March | "Right Round" | Flo Rida featuring Kesha | |
| 30 March | "Right Round" | Flo Rida featuring Kesha | |
| 6 April | "Love Story" | Taylor Swift | |
| 13 April | "Don't Trust Me" | 3OH!3 | |
| 20 April | "Don't Trust Me" | 3OH!3 | |
| 27 April | "Jai Ho! (You Are My Destiny)" | A. R. Rahman and The Pussycat Dolls featuring Nicole Scherzinger | |
| 4 May | "Jai Ho! (You Are My Destiny)" | A. R. Rahman and The Pussycat Dolls featuring Nicole Scherzinger | |
| 11 May | "Boom Boom Pow" | The Black Eyed Peas | |
| 18 May | "Boom Boom Pow" | The Black Eyed Peas | |
| 25 May | "Boom Boom Pow" | The Black Eyed Peas | |
| 1 June | "Boom Boom Pow" | The Black Eyed Peas | |
| 8 June | "Boom Boom Pow" | The Black Eyed Peas | |
| 15 June | "Boom Boom Pow" | The Black Eyed Peas | |
| 22 June | "Boom Boom Pow" | The Black Eyed Peas | |
| 29 June | "I Gotta Feeling"† | The Black Eyed Peas | |
| 6 July | "I Gotta Feeling"† | The Black Eyed Peas | |
| 13 July | "I Gotta Feeling"† | The Black Eyed Peas | |
| 20 July | "I Gotta Feeling"† | The Black Eyed Peas | |
| 27 July | "I Gotta Feeling"† | The Black Eyed Peas | |
| 3 August | "I Gotta Feeling"† | The Black Eyed Peas | |
| 10 August | "I Gotta Feeling"† | The Black Eyed Peas | |
| 17 August | "Sexy Bitch" | David Guetta featuring Akon | |
| 24 August | "Sexy Bitch" | David Guetta featuring Akon | |
| 31 August | "Sexy Bitch" | David Guetta featuring Akon | |
| 7 September | "Sexy Bitch" | David Guetta featuring Akon | |
| 14 September | "Sexy Bitch" | David Guetta featuring Akon | |
| 21 September | "Sexy Bitch" | David Guetta featuring Akon | |
| 28 September | "Sexy Bitch" | David Guetta featuring Akon | |
| 5 October | "Sexy Bitch" | David Guetta featuring Akon | |
| 12 October | "Sexy Bitch" | David Guetta featuring Akon | |
| 19 October | "This Is Who I Am" | Vanessa Amorosi | |
| 26 October | "This Is Who I Am" | Vanessa Amorosi | |
| 2 November | "Meet Me Halfway" | The Black Eyed Peas | |
| 9 November | "Tik Tok" | Kesha | |
| 16 November | "Tik Tok" | Kesha | |
| 23 November | "Tik Tok" | Kesha | |
| 30 November | "Tik Tok" | Kesha | |
| 7 December | "Tik Tok" | Kesha | |
| 14 December | "Tik Tok" | Kesha | |
| 21 December | "Tik Tok" | Kesha | |
| 28 December | "Fireflies" | Owl City | |

== Number-one artists ==
| Position | Artist | Weeks at No. 1 |
|---|---|---|
| 1 | The Black Eyed Peas | 15 |
| 2 | Kesha | 13 |
| 3 | Akon | 9 |
| 3 | David Guetta | 9 |
| 4 | Flo Rida | 6 |
| 4 | Kesha | 6 |
| 5 | The Fray | 4 |
| 6 | A. R. Rahman | 2 |
| 6 | Jessica Mauboy | 2 |
| 6 | The Pussycat Dolls | 2 |
| 6 | Vanessa Amorosi | 2 |
| 6 | 3OH!3 | 2 |
| 7 | Lady Gaga | 1 |
| 7 | Owl City | 1 |
| 7 | Taylor Swift | 1 |

== See also ==
- 2009 in music
