= List of number-one albums of 2010 (Australia) =

ARIA Charts number-one albums of 2010 < 2009 2011 >

Other Australian number-one charts of 2010
- singles
- urban singles
- dance singles
- club tracks
- digital tracks

Top Australian singles and albums of 2010
- Triple J Hottest 100
- top 25 singles
- top 25 albums

The highest-selling albums and EPs in Australia are ranked in the ARIA Albums Chart, published by the Australian Recording Industry Association (ARIA). The data are compiled from a sample that is based on each album's weekly physical and digital sales. There was a total of 21 number-one albums in 2010.

Susan Boyle's I Dreamed a Dream, Eminem's Recovery and Pink's Greatest Hits... So Far!!! were the longest-running number-one albums of the year, with each album scoring six consecutive weeks at the top.

== Chart history ==
Key
The yellow background indicates the #1 album on ARIA's End of Year Albums Chart of 2010.

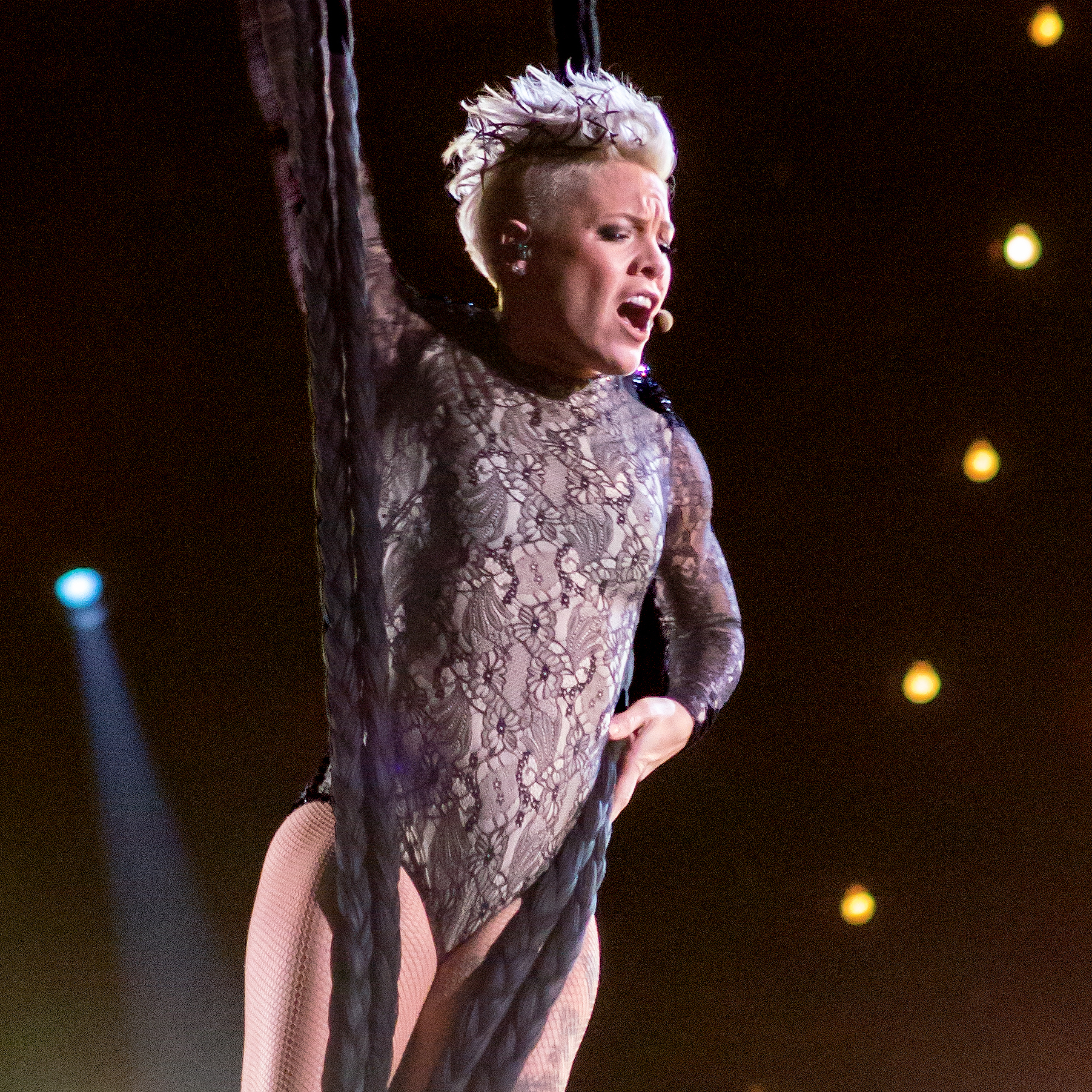
Pink's Greatest Hits... So Far!!! album was the best selling album of the year and spent 13 weeks at number one (6 in 2010 and 7 in 2011)

Date	Album	Artist(s)	Ref
4 January	I Dreamed a Dream	Susan Boyle	
11 January	I Dreamed a Dream	Susan Boyle	
18 January	I Dreamed a Dream	Susan Boyle	
25 January	I Dreamed a Dream	Susan Boyle	
1 February	I Dreamed a Dream	Susan Boyle	
8 February	I Dreamed a Dream	Susan Boyle	
15 February	Sigh No More	Mumford & Sons	
22 February	Sigh No More	Mumford & Sons	
1 March	Sigh No More	Mumford & Sons	
8 March	Recollection	k.d. lang	
15 March	Plastic Beach	Gorillaz	
22 March	Down the Way	Angus and Julia Stone	
29 March	Down the Way	Angus and Julia Stone	
5 April	April Uprising	The John Butler Trio	
12 April	The Fame Monster	Lady Gaga	
19 April	The Fame Monster	Lady Gaga	
26 April	The Fame Monster	Lady Gaga	
3 May	My Worlds	Justin Bieber	
10 May	Recollection	k.d. lang	
17 May	Recollection	k.d. lang	
24 May	My Worlds	Justin Bieber	
31 May	Glee: The Music, Volume 3 Showstoppers	Glee Cast	
7 June	Glee: The Music, Volume 3 Showstoppers	Glee Cast	
14 June	To the Sea	Jack Johnson	
21 June	Intriguer	Crowded House	
28 June	Recovery	Eminem	
5 July	Recovery	Eminem	
12 July	Recovery	Eminem	
19 July	Recovery	Eminem	
26 July	Recovery	Eminem	
2 August	Recovery	Eminem	
9 August	Running on Air	Bliss n Eso	
16 August	Recovery	Eminem	
23 August	Recovery	Eminem	
30 August	Recovery	Eminem	
6 September	Teenage Dream	Katy Perry	
13 September	Teenage Dream	Katy Perry	
20 September	A Thousand Suns	Linkin Park	
27 September	A Thousand Suns	Linkin Park	
4 October	A Thousand Suns	Linkin Park	
11 October	A Thousand Suns	Linkin Park	
18 October	There Is a Hell Believe Me I've Seen It. There Is a Heaven Let's Keep It a Secret.	Bring Me the Horizon	
25 October	Come Around Sundown	Kings of Leon	
1 November	Come Around Sundown	Kings of Leon	
8 November	Speak Now	Taylor Swift	
15 November	Greatest Hits	Bon Jovi	
22 November	Greatest Hits... So Far!!!	Pink	
29 November	Greatest Hits... So Far!!!	Pink	
6 December	Greatest Hits... So Far!!!	Pink	
13 December	Greatest Hits... So Far!!!	Pink	
20 December	Greatest Hits... So Far!!!	Pink	
27 December	Greatest Hits... So Far!!!	Pink	

== Number-one artists ==
Position	Artist	Weeks at No. 1
1	Eminem	9
2	Susan Boyle	6
2	Pink	6
3	Linkin Park	4
4	Mumford & Sons	3
4	k.d. lang	3
4	Lady Gaga	3
5	Angus and Julia Stone	2
5	Justin Bieber	2
5	Glee Cast	2
5	Katy Perry	2
5	Kings of Leon	2
6	Gorillaz	1
6	The John Butler Trio	1
6	Jack Johnson	1
6	Crowded House	1
6	Bliss n Eso	1
6	Bring Me the Horizon	1
6	Taylor Swift	1
6	Bon Jovi	1

== See also ==
- 2010 in music
- List of number-one singles in Australia in 2010
