= List of number-one club tracks of 2009 (Australia) =

ARIA Charts number-one club tracks of 2009 < 2008 2010 >

Other Australian number-one charts of 2009
- albums
- singles
- urban singles
- dance singles
- digital tracks

Top Australian singles and albums of 2009
- Triple J Hottest 100
- top 25 singles
- top 25 albums

This is a list of number-one hits on the ARIA Club Chart in 2009, compiled by the Australian Recording Industry Association (ARIA) from weekly DJ reports.

== 2009 ==
Date		Song	Artist(s)	Reference
January	19	"Blue Monday"	Kurd Maverick	
January	26	"We Are the People"	Empire of the Sun	
February	2	"We Are the People"	Empire of the Sun	
February	9	"We Are the People"	Empire of the Sun	
February	16	"Riverside"	Sidney Samson	
February	23	"Riverside"	Sidney Samson	
March	2	"Riverside"	Sidney Samson	
March	9	"Riverside"	Sidney Samson	
March	16	"Riverside"	Sidney Samson	
March	23	"Riverside"	Sidney Samson	
March	30	"Riverside"	Sidney Samson	
April	6	"Riverside"	Sidney Samson	
April	13	"Riverside"	Sidney Samson	
April	20	"Riverside"	Sidney Samson	
April	27	"Now You're Gone"	Juan Kidd and Felix Baumgartner	
May	4	"Now You're Gone"	Juan Kidd and Felix Baumgartner	
May	11	"Now You're Gone"	Juan Kidd and Felix Baumgartner	
May	18	"Now You're Gone"	Juan Kidd and Felix Baumgartner	
May	25	"Now You're Gone"	Juan Kidd and Felix Baumgartner	
June	1	"Bonkers"	Dizzee Rascal and Armand Van Helden	
June	8	"Bonkers"	Dizzee Rascal and Armand Van Helden	
June	15	"Bonkers"	Dizzee Rascal and Armand Van Helden	
June	22	"Bonkers"	Dizzee Rascal and Armand Van Helden	
June	29	"Bonkers"	Dizzee Rascal and Armand Van Helden	
July	6	"Bonkers"	Dizzee Rascal and Armand Van Helden	
July	13	"In the Air"	TV Rock featuring Rudy	
July	20	"In the Air"	TV Rock featuring Rudy	
July	27	"In the Air"	TV Rock featuring Rudy	
August	3	"In the Air"	TV Rock featuring Rudy	
August	10	"In the Air"	TV Rock featuring Rudy	
August	17	"In the Air"	TV Rock featuring Rudy	
August	24	"In the Air"	TV Rock featuring Rudy	
August	31	"Sexy Bitch"	David Guetta featuring Akon	
September	7	"Sexy Bitch"	David Guetta featuring Akon	
September	14	"Sexy Bitch"	David Guetta featuring Akon	
September	21	"Sexy Bitch"	David Guetta featuring Akon	
September	28	"Sexy Bitch"	David Guetta featuring Akon	
October	5	"Sexy Bitch"	David Guetta featuring Akon	
October	12	"Let Me Be Real"	Fedde Le Grand	
October	19	"Let Me Be Real"	Fedde Le Grand	
October	26	"ANYway"	Duck Sauce	
November	2	"ANYway"	Duck Sauce	
November	9	"ANYway"	Duck Sauce	
November	16	"ANYway"	Duck Sauce	
November	23	"ANYway"	Duck Sauce	
November	30	"ANYway"	Duck Sauce	
December	7	"ANYway"	Duck Sauce	
December	14	"Devotion"	Bingo Players	
December	21	"Devotion"	Bingo Players	
December	28	"Devotion"	Bingo Players	

== Number-one artists ==
Position	Artist	Weeks at No. 1
1	Sidney Samson	10
2	Duck Sauce	7
2	TV Rock	7
3	Armand Van Helden	6
3	Dizzee Rascal	6
3	David Guetta	6
4	Juan Kid	5
5	Empire of the Sun	3
5	Bingo Players	3
6	Fedde le Grand	2
7	Kurd Maverick	1

== See also ==
- ARIA Charts
- List of number-one singles of 2009 (Australia)
- List of number-one albums of 2009 (Australia)
- 2009 in music
