= List of number-one urban singles of 2009 (Australia) =

ARIA Charts number-one urban singles of 2009 < 2008 2010 >

Other Australian number-one charts of 2009
- albums
- singles
- dance singles
- club tracks
- digital tracks

Top Australian singles and albums of 2009
- Triple J Hottest 100
- top 25 singles
- top 25 albums

The ARIA Urban Chart is a chart that ranks the best-performing Urban tracks singles of Australia. It is published by Australian Recording Industry Association (ARIA), an organisation who collect music data for the weekly ARIA Charts. To be eligible to appear on the chart, the recording must be a single, and be "predominantly of a Urban nature".

== Chart history ==
Issue date	Song	Artist(s)	Reference
5 January	"Live Your Life"	T.I. featuring Rihanna	
12 January	"Burn"	Jessica Mauboy	
19 January	"Burn"	Jessica Mauboy	
26 January	"Burn"	Jessica Mauboy	
2 February	"Burn"	Jessica Mauboy	
9 February	"Burn"	Jessica Mauboy	
16 February	"Burn"	Jessica Mauboy	
23 February	"Right Round"	Flo Rida featuring Kesha	
2 March	"Right Round"	Flo Rida featuring Kesha	
9 March	"Right Round"	Flo Rida featuring Kesha	
16 March	"Right Round"	Flo Rida featuring Kesha	
23 March	"Right Round"	Flo Rida featuring Kesha	
30 March	"Right Round"	Flo Rida featuring Kesha	
6 April	"Right Round"	Flo Rida featuring Kesha	
13 April	"Right Round"	Flo Rida featuring Kesha	
20 April	"Right Round"	Flo Rida featuring Kesha	
27 April	"Jai Ho! (You Are My Destiny)"	A. R. Rahman and The Pussycat Dolls featuring Nicole Scherzinger	
4 May	"Jai Ho! (You Are My Destiny)"	A. R. Rahman and The Pussycat Dolls featuring Nicole Scherzinger	
11 May	"Boom Boom Pow"	The Black Eyed Peas	
18 May	"Boom Boom Pow"	The Black Eyed Peas	
25 May	"Boom Boom Pow"	The Black Eyed Peas	
1 June	"Boom Boom Pow"	The Black Eyed Peas	
8 June	"Boom Boom Pow"	The Black Eyed Peas	
15 June	"Boom Boom Pow"	The Black Eyed Peas	
22 June	"Boom Boom Pow"	The Black Eyed Peas	
29 June	"Boom Boom Pow"	The Black Eyed Peas	
6 July	"Boom Boom Pow"	The Black Eyed Peas	
13 July	"Boom Boom Pow"	The Black Eyed Peas	
20 July	"Boom Boom Pow"	The Black Eyed Peas	
27 July	"Battlefield"	Jordin Sparks	
3 August	"Sweet Dreams"	Beyoncé	
10 August	"Sweet Dreams"	Beyoncé	
17 August	"Sweet Dreams"	Beyoncé	
24 August	"Sweet Dreams"	Beyoncé	
31 August	"Sweet Dreams"	Beyoncé	
7 September	"Sweet Dreams"	Beyoncé	
14 September	"Sweet Dreams"	Beyoncé	
21 September	"Meet Me Halfway"	The Black Eyed Peas	
28 September	"Meet Me Halfway"	The Black Eyed Peas	
5 October	"Meet Me Halfway"	The Black Eyed Peas	
12 October	"Meet Me Halfway"	The Black Eyed Peas	
19 October	"Meet Me Halfway"	The Black Eyed Peas	
26 October	"Meet Me Halfway"	The Black Eyed Peas	
2 November	"Meet Me Halfway"	The Black Eyed Peas	
9 November	"Meet Me Halfway"	The Black Eyed Peas	
16 November	"Meet Me Halfway"	The Black Eyed Peas	
23 November	"Down"	Jay Sean featuring Lil Wayne	
30 November	"Down"	Jay Sean featuring Lil Wayne	
7 December	"Down"	Jay Sean featuring Lil Wayne	
14 December	"Empire State Of Mind"	Jay-Z featuring Alicia Keys	
21 December	"Empire State Of Mind"	Jay-Z featuring Alicia Keys	
28 December	"Empire State Of Mind"	Jay-Z featuring Alicia Keys	

== Number-one artists ==
Position	Artist	Weeks at No. 1
1	The Black Eyed Peas	20
2	Flo Rida	9
2	Kesha	9
3	Beyoncé	7
4	Jessica Mauboy	6
5	Jay Sean	3
5	Lil Wayne	3
5	Jay-Z	3
5	Alicia Keys	3
6	A. R. Rahman	2
6	The Pussycat Dolls	2
7	Rihanna	1
7	T.I.	1
7	Jordin Sparks	1

== See also ==
- 2009 in music
- List of number-one singles of 2009 (Australia)
