= List of top 25 singles for 2010 in Australia =

Top 25 singles of 2010 < 2009 2011 >

Other Australian top charts for 2010
- top 25 albums
- Triple J Hottest 100

Australian number-one charts of 2010
- albums
- singles
- urban singles
- dance singles
- club tracks
- digital tracks

The following lists the top 25 singles of 2010 in Australia from the Australian Recording Industry Association (ARIA) End of Year singles chart.

"Love The Way You Lie" by Eminem featuring Rihanna was the biggest song of the year, peaking at #1 for 6 weeks and staying in the Top 50 (so far) for 30 weeks. The longest stay at number one was also "Love The Way You Lie" by Eminem featuring Rihanna, as well as "OMG" by Usher and will.i.am, which both stayed at number one for 6 weeks.

#	Title	Artist	Highest pos. reached	Weeks at No. 1
1.	"Love the Way You Lie"	Eminem featuring Rihanna	1	6
2.	"OMG"	Usher featuring will.i.am	1	6
3.	"Dynamite"	Taio Cruz	1	4
4.	"Hey, Soul Sister"	Train	1	4
5.	"California Gurls"	Katy Perry featuring Snoop Dogg	1	4
6.	"Fireflies"	Owl City	1	5
7.	"Only Girl (In the World)"	Rihanna	1	4
8.	"Just the Way You Are"	Bruno Mars	1	1
9.	"Teenage Dream"	Katy Perry	2	
10.	"DJ Got Us Fallin' in Love"	Usher featuring Pitbull	3	
11.	"Airplanes"	B.o.B featuring Hayley Williams	2	
12.	"Tik Tok"	Ke$ha	1	8
13.	"In My Head"	Jason Derulo	1	2
14.	"I Like It"	Enrique Iglesias featuring Pitbull	2	
15.	"Replay"	Iyaz	1	2
16.	"Just a Dream"	Nelly	3	
17.	"Raise Your Glass"	P!nk	1	1
18.	"Club Can't Handle Me"	Flo Rida featuring David Guetta	3	
19.	"Empire State of Mind"	Jay-Z featuring Alicia Keys	4	
20.	"Telephone"	Lady Gaga featuring Beyoncé	3	
21.	"Cooler than Me"	Mike Posner	4	
22.	"Not Afraid"	Eminem	4	
23.	"Fuck You"	CeeLo Green	5	
24.	"Firework"	Katy Perry	3	
25.	"We R Who We R"	Ke$ha	1	3
