= List of number-one albums of 2009 (Australia) =

ARIA Charts number-one albums of 2009 < 2008 2010 >

Other Australian number-one charts of 2009
- singles
- urban singles
- dance singles
- club tracks
- digital tracks

Top Australian singles and albums of 2009
- Triple J Hottest 100
- top 25 singles
- top 25 albums

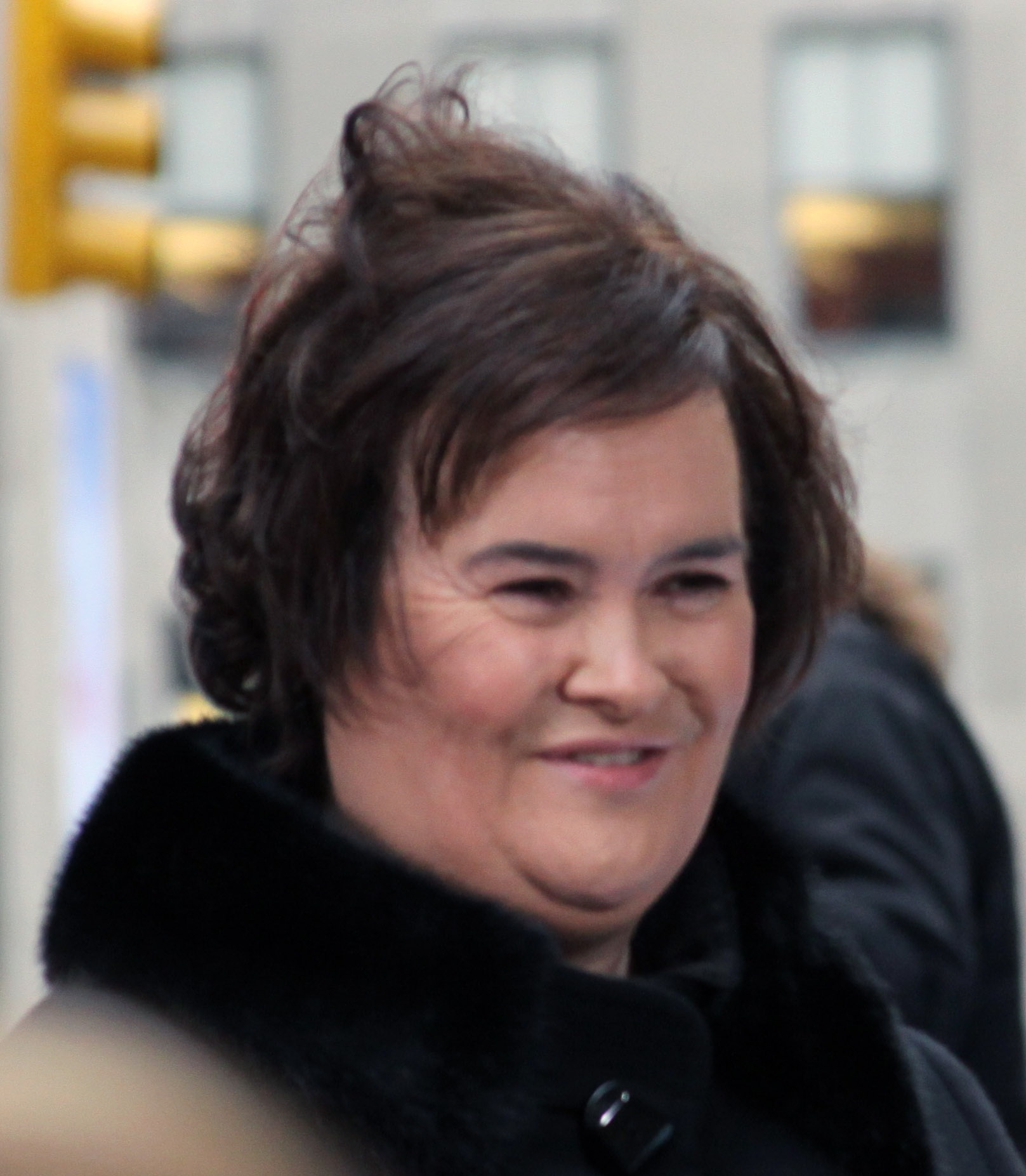
Susan Boyle had one of the two longest runs at number one in 2009, as well as reaching number one on the end of year albums chart with I Dreamed a Dream.

The highest-selling albums in Australia are ranked in the Australian Recording Industry Association albums chart, also known as the ARIA Charts, published by the Australian Recording Industry Association (ARIA). The data are compiled from a sample that includes music stores, music departments at electronics and department stores, and Internet sales (in other words, both digital as well as CD sales). ARIA also issues a weekly singles chart. In addition, data from these weekly charts are used to compile an end of year albums and singles chart.

Alternative rock band Kings of Leon's Only by the Night had the longest non-consecutive run among the releases that reached peak position in 2009; it spent 14 non-consecutive weeks atop the chart, beginning in the 2008 chart year and continuing until 13 April, with a break between 16 February and 23 March. The Essential Michael Jackson by Michael Jackson, and I Dreamed a Dream by Susan Boyle had the longest consecutive run atop the chart, spending 7 weeks each at number one. In total, there were 19 number one albums during 2009.

During 2009, six acts received their first Australian number one album, these being Lily Allen, Natalie Bassingthwaighte, Paramore, Ronan Keating, Short Stack and Susan Boyle.

I Dreamed a Dream, which debuted at number one on 30 November, was 2009's highest selling album on the ARIA end-of-year albums chart, ahead of Pink's album Funhouse.

Key
The yellow background indicates the #1 album on ARIA's End of Year Albums Chart of 2009.

== Chart history ==
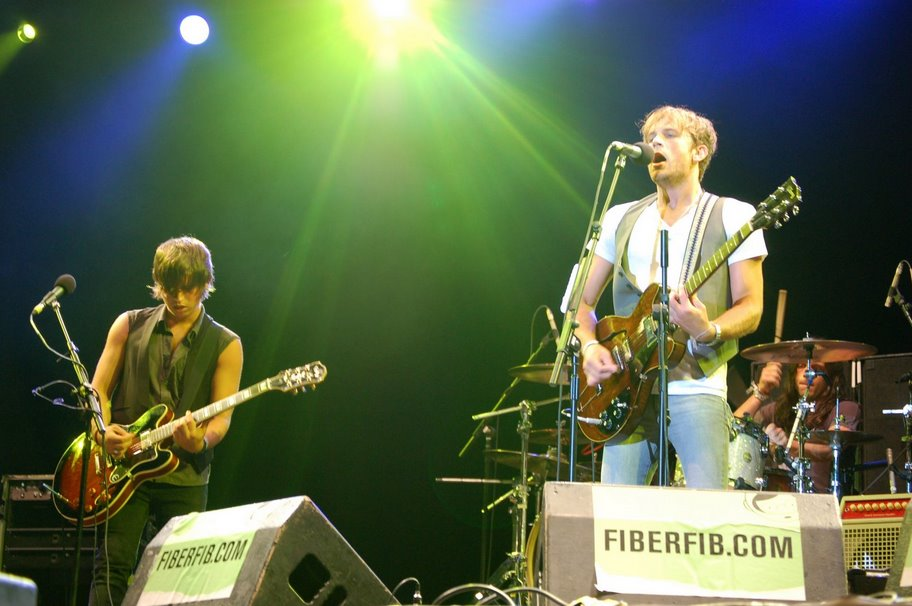
The Kings of Leon has the album with the longest stay at number one in 2009 with Only by the Night.

Issue date of chart	Album	Artist	Weeks at number one (total)	Reference
5 January; 12 January; 19 January; 26 January; 2 February; 9 February	Only by the Night	Kings of Leon	14	
16 February; 23 February	It's Not Me, It's You	Lily Allen	3	
2 March	1000 Stars	Natalie Bassingthwaighte	1	
9 March; 16 March	No Line on the Horizon	U2	2	
23 March; 30 March; 6 April; 13 April	Only by the Night	Kings of Leon	14	
20 April	It's Not Me, It's You	Lily Allen	3	
27 April; 4 May; 11 May; 18 May	Songs for My Mother	Ronan Keating	4	
25 May; 1 June	Relapse	Eminem	2	
8 June	Inshalla	Eskimo Joe	1	
15 June	The E.N.D.	The Black Eyed Peas	3	
22 June; 29 June	State of the Art	Hilltop Hoods	2	
6 July; 13 July; 20 July; 27 July; 3 August; 10 August; 17 August	The Essential Michael Jackson	Michael Jackson	7	
24 August	Stack Is the New Black	Short Stack	1	
30 August	The E.N.D.	The Black Eyed Peas	3	
7 September; 14 September	The Rhythm and the Blues	Jimmy Barnes	2	
21 September	The Resistance	Muse	1	
28 September	Backspacer	Pearl Jam	1	
5 October	Brand New Eyes	Paramore	1	
12 October	The E.N.D.	The Black Eyed Peas	3	
19 October; 26 October; 2 November	Crazy Love	Michael Bublé	6	
9 November	Greatest Hits	Foo Fighters	1	
16 November	Reality Killed the Video Star	Robbie Williams	1	
23 November	Golden Rule	Powderfinger	1	
30 November; 7 December; 14 December; 21 December; 28 December	I Dreamed a Dream	Susan Boyle	11	

== See also ==
- 2009 in music
- List of number-one singles of 2009 (Australia)
