= List of number-one digital tracks of 2010 (Australia) =

ARIA Charts number-one digital tracks of 2010 < 2009 2011 >

Other Australian number-one charts of 2010
- albums
- singles
- urban singles
- dance singles
- club tracks

Top Australian singles and albums of 2010
- Triple J Hottest 100
- top 25 singles
- top 25 albums

The ARIA Digital Track Chart is a chart that ranks the best-performing digital tracks singles of Australia. It is published by Australian Recording Industry Association (ARIA), an organisation who collect music data for the weekly ARIA Charts. To be eligible to appear on the chart, the recording must be a single not an EP and only paid downloads counted from downloadable outlets.

== Chart history ==
Key
†	Indicates number-one digital single of 2010

Issue date	Song	Artist(s)	Reference
4 January	"Fireflies"	Owl City	
11 January	"Fireflies"	Owl City	
18 January	"Fireflies"	Owl City	
25 January	"Fireflies"	Owl City	
1 February	"Fireflies"	Owl City	
8 February	"Replay"	Iyaz	
15 February	"Replay"	Iyaz	
22 February	"In My Head"	Jason Derulo	
1 March	"In My Head"	Jason Derulo	
8 March	"Rude Boy"	Rihanna	
15 March	"Rude Boy"	Rihanna	
22 March	"Hey, Soul Sister"	Train	
29 March	"Hey, Soul Sister"	Train	
5 April	"Hey, Soul Sister"	Train	
12 April	"Hey, Soul Sister"	Train	
19 April	"Just Say So"	Brian McFadden featuring Kevin Rudolf	
26 April	"Just Say So"	Brian McFadden featuring Kevin Rudolf	
3 May	"Just Say So"	Brian McFadden featuring Kevin Rudolf	
10 May	"OMG"	Usher featuring Will.i.am	
17 May	"OMG"	Usher featuring Will.i.am	
24 May	"OMG"	Usher featuring Will.i.am	
31 May	"OMG"	Usher featuring Will.i.am	
7 June	"OMG"	Usher featuring Will.i.am	
14 June	"OMG"	Usher featuring Will.i.am	
21 June	"California Gurls"	Katy Perry featuring Snoop Dogg	
28 June	"California Gurls"	Katy Perry featuring Snoop Dogg	
5 July	"California Gurls"	Katy Perry featuring Snoop Dogg	
12 July	"California Gurls"	Katy Perry featuring Snoop Dogg	
19 July	"Love the Way You Lie"†	Eminem featuring Rihanna	
26 July	"Love the Way You Lie"†	Eminem featuring Rihanna	
2 August	"Love the Way You Lie"†	Eminem featuring Rihanna	
9 August	"Love the Way You Lie"†	Eminem featuring Rihanna	
16 August	"Love the Way You Lie"†	Eminem featuring Rihanna	
23 August	"Love the Way You Lie"†	Eminem featuring Rihanna	
30 August	"Dynamite"	Taio Cruz	
6 September	"Dynamite"	Taio Cruz	
13 September	"Dynamite"	Taio Cruz	
20 September	"Dynamite"	Taio Cruz	
27 September	"Only Girl (In the World)"	Rihanna	
4 October	"Only Girl (In the World)"	Rihanna	
11 October	"Only Girl (In the World)"	Rihanna	
18 October	"Raise Your Glass"	Pink	
25 October	"Just the Way You Are"	Bruno Mars	
1 November	"Only Girl (In The World)"	Rihanna	
8 November	"We R Who We R"	Kesha	
15 November	"We R Who We R"	Kesha	
22 November	"The Time (Dirty Bit)"	The Black Eyed Peas	
29 November	"We R Who We R"	Kesha	
6 December	"The Time (Dirty Bit)"	The Black Eyed Peas	
13 December	"Grenade"	Bruno Mars	
20 December	"Grenade"	Bruno Mars	
27 December	"Who's That Girl"	Guy Sebastian featuring Eve	

== Number-one artists ==
Position	Artist	Weeks at No. 1
1	Rihanna	12
2	Eminem	6
2	Usher	6
2	Will.i.am	6
3	Owl City	5
4	Katy Perry	4
4	Snoop Dogg	4
4	Taio Cruz	4
4	Train	4
5	Brian McFadden	3
5	Bruno Mars	3
5	Kevin Rudolf	3
6	The Black Eyed Peas	2
6	Iyaz	2
6	Jason Derulo	2
6	Kesha	2
7	Eve	1
7	Guy Sebastian	1
7	Pink	1

== See also ==
- 2010 in music
