= List of top 25 singles for 2009 in Australia =

Top 25 singles of 2009 < 2008 2010 >

Other Australian top charts for 2009
- top 25 albums
- Triple J Hottest 100

Australian number-one charts of 2009
- albums
- singles
- urban singles
- dance singles
- club tracks
- digital tracks

The following lists the top 25 singles of 2009 in Australia from the Australian Recording Industry Association (ARIA) End of Year singles chart.

"I Gotta Feeling" by The Black Eyed Peas was the biggest song of the year, peaking at #1 for 7 weeks and staying in the Top 50 (so far) for 30 weeks. The longest stay at #1 was "TiK ToK" by Kesha which spent 8 weeks at #1.

#	Title	Artist	Highest pos. reached	Weeks at No. 1
1.	"I Gotta Feeling"	The Black Eyed Peas	1	7
2.	"Sexy Bitch"	David Guetta feat. Akon	1	7
3.	"Love Story"	Taylor Swift	1	2
4.	"Boom Boom Pow"	The Black Eyed Peas	1	6
5.	"Right Round"	Flo Rida feat. Kesha	1	7
6.	"Like It Like That"	Guy Sebastian	1	2
7.	"Halo"	Beyoncé	3	
8.	"Meet Me Halfway"	The Black Eyed Peas	1	1
9.	"TiK ToK"	Kesha	1	8
10.	"The Last Day on Earth"	Kate Miller-Heidke	3	
11.	"Poker Face"	Lady Gaga	1	8
12.	"Paparazzi"	Lady Gaga	2	
13.	"You Found Me"	The Fray	1	4
14.	"Single Ladies (Put a Ring on It)"	Beyoncé	5	
15.	"Jai Ho! (You Are My Destiny)"	A. R. Rahman feat. The Pussycat Dolls	1	2
16.	"The Climb"	Miley Cyrus	5	
17.	"You Belong with Me"	Taylor Swift	5	
18.	"Evacuate the Dancefloor"	Cascada	3	
19.	"Gives You Hell"	The All-American Rejects	3	
20.	"Not Fair"	Lily Allen	3	
21.	"I Know You Want Me (Calle Ocho)"	Pitbull	6	
22.	"The Fear"	Lily Allen	3	
23.	"Sweet Dreams"	Beyoncé	2	
24.	"Breakeven"	The Script	3	
25.	"Good Girls Go Bad"	Cobra Starship feat. Leighton Meester	5	
