= List of number-one singles of 2009 (Australia) =

ARIA Charts number-one singles of 2009 < 2008 2010 >

Other Australian number-one charts of 2009
- albums
- urban singles
- dance singles
- club tracks
- digital tracks

Top Australian singles and albums of 2009
- Triple J Hottest 100
- top 25 singles
- top 25 albums

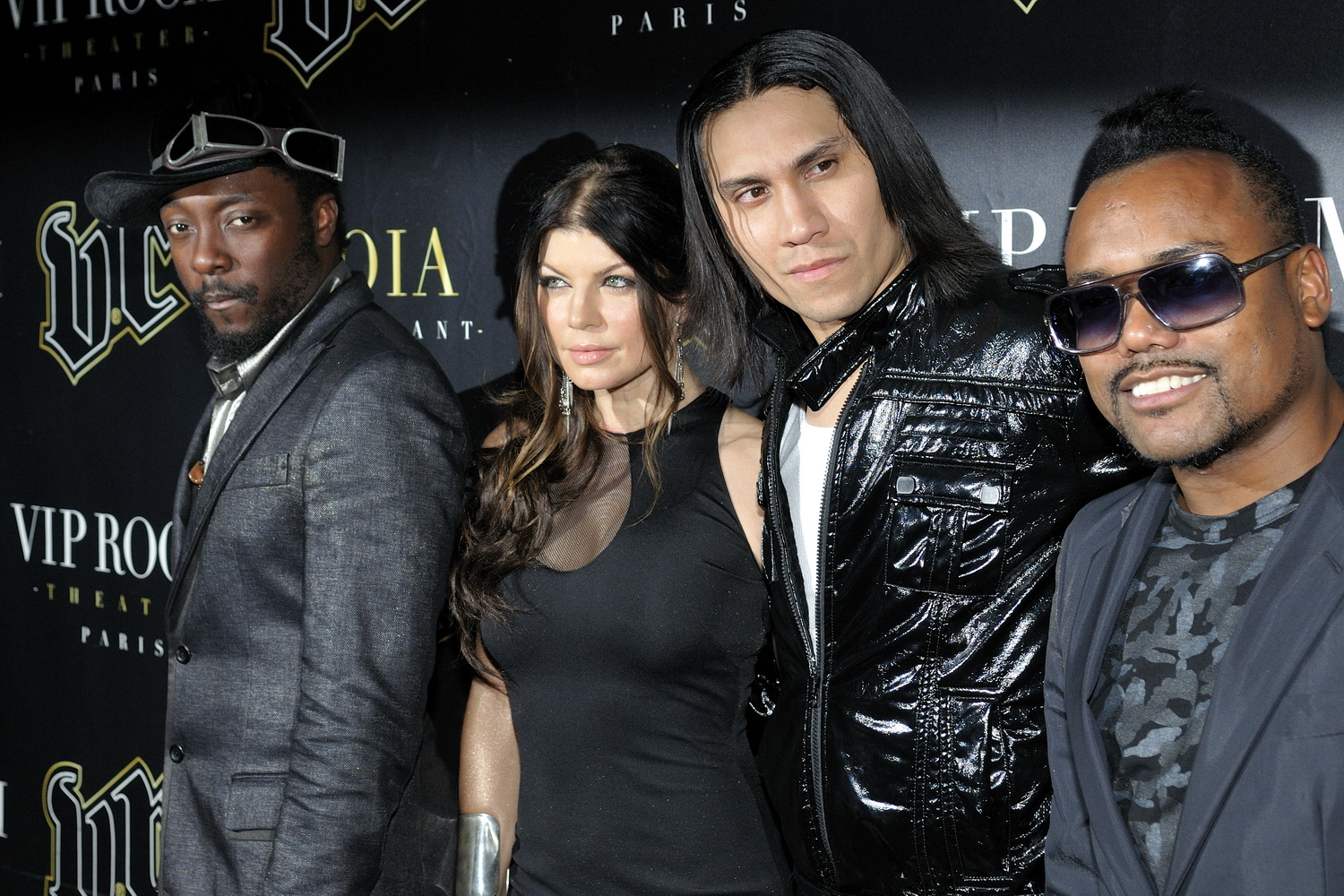
The Black Eyed Peas achieved three number-one singles in 2009 for "Boom Boom Pow", "I Gotta Feeling" and "Meet Me Halfway", spanning 14 weeks in total at number-one on the chart.

The ARIA Singles Chart ranks the best-performing singles in Australia. Its data, published by the Australian Recording Industry Association, is based collectively on each single's weekly physical and digital sales. In 2009, 14 singles claimed the top spot, including Lady Gaga's "Poker Face", which started its peak position in late 2008. Seven acts achieved their first number-one single in Australia, either as a lead or featured artist: Jessica Mauboy, The Fray, Taylor Swift, A. R. Rahman, Nicole Scherzinger, David Guetta, Vanessa Amorosi and Kesha.

The Black Eyed Peas earned three number-one singles during the year for "Boom Boom Pow", "I Gotta Feeling" and "Meet Me Halfway". Kesha's "Tik Tok" was longest-running number-one single in 2009, having topped the ARIA Singles Chart for eight consecutive weeks. Flo Rida's "Right Round", The Black Eyed Peas' "I Gotta Feeling", and Guetta's "Sexy Bitch" each spent seven weeks at the number-one spot.

== Chart history ==
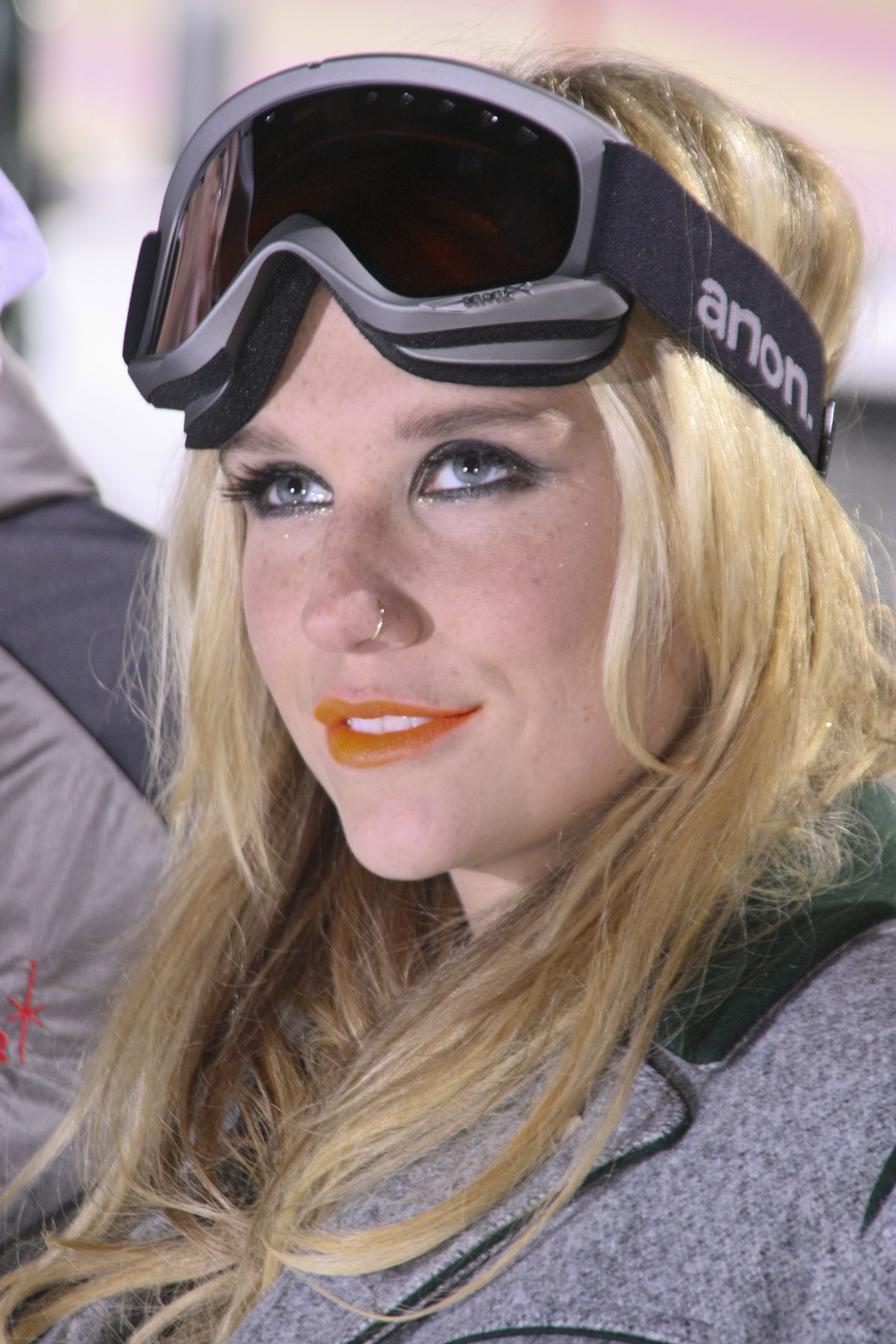
Kesha's "Tik Tok" was the longest running number-one single of 2009, having topped the ARIA Singles Chart for eight consecutive weeks.

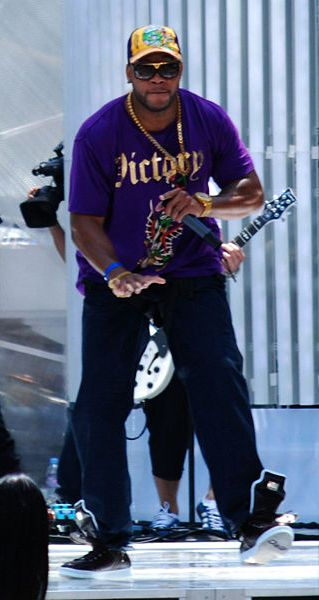
Flo Rida's "Right Round" topped the ARIA Singles Chart for seven weeks, becoming his second number-one single on the chart.

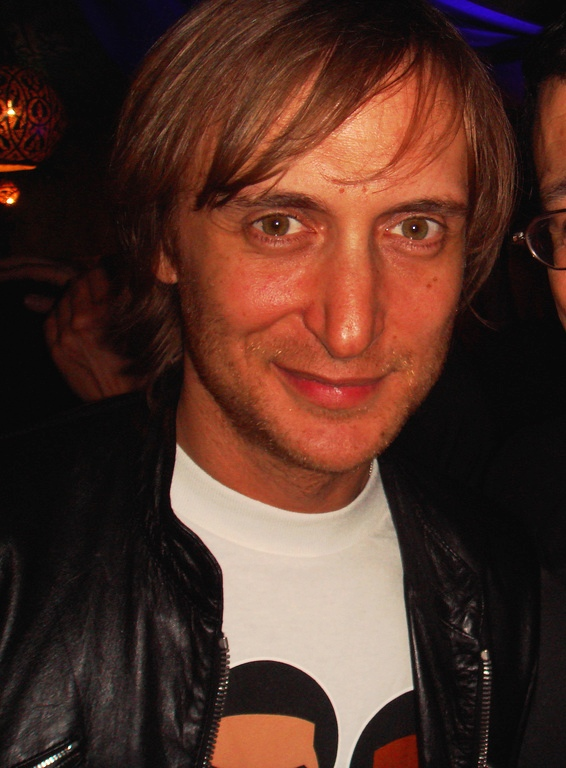
David Guetta's "Sexy Bitch" topped the ARIA Singles Chart for seven weeks, becoming his first number-one single on the chart.

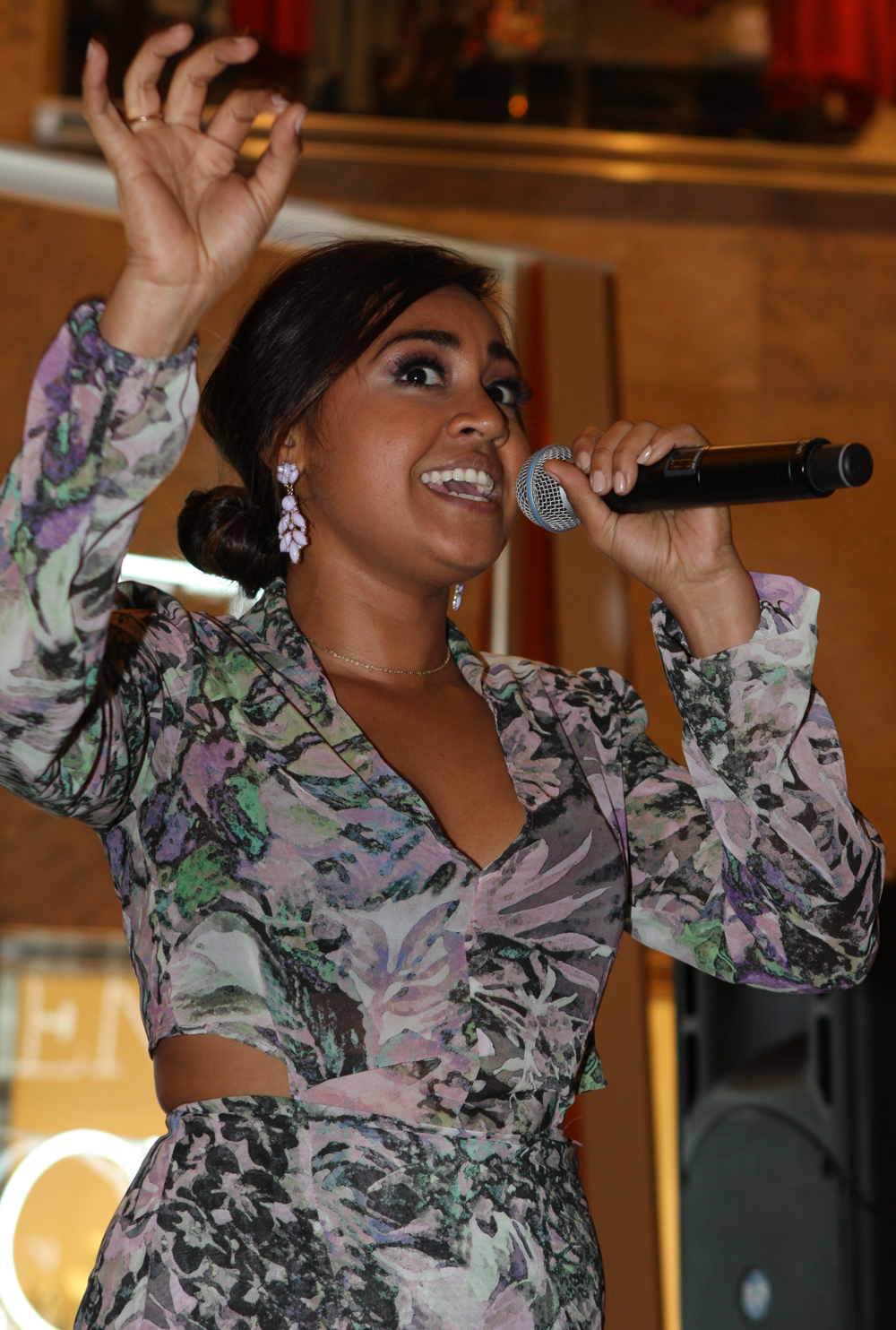
Indigenous Australian artist Jessica Mauboy earned her first number-one single on the chart, Burn, in 2009.

Key
The yellow background indicates the #1 song on ARIA's End of Year Singles Chart of 2009.

Date	Song	Artist(s)	Ref.
5 January	"Poker Face"	Lady Gaga	
12 January	"Poker Face"	Lady Gaga	
19 January	"Burn"	Jessica Mauboy	
26 January	"You Found Me"	The Fray	
2 February	"You Found Me"	The Fray	
9 February	"You Found Me"	The Fray	
16 February	"You Found Me"	The Fray	
23 February	"Right Round"	Flo Rida featuring Kesha	
2 March	"Right Round"	Flo Rida featuring Kesha	
9 March	"Right Round"	Flo Rida featuring Kesha	
16 March	"Right Round"	Flo Rida featuring Kesha	
23 March	"Love Story"	Taylor Swift	
30 March	"Right Round"	Flo Rida featuring Kesha	
6 April	"Love Story"	Taylor Swift	
13 April	"Right Round"	Flo Rida featuring Kesha	
20 April	"Right Round"	Flo Rida featuring Kesha	
27 April	"Jai Ho! (You Are My Destiny)"	A. R. Rahman and The Pussycat Dolls featuring Nicole Scherzinger	
4 May	"Jai Ho! (You Are My Destiny)"	A. R. Rahman and The Pussycat Dolls featuring Nicole Scherzinger	
11 May	"We Made You"	Eminem	
18 May	"Boom Boom Pow"	The Black Eyed Peas	
25 May	"Boom Boom Pow"	The Black Eyed Peas	
1 June	"Boom Boom Pow"	The Black Eyed Peas	
8 June	"Boom Boom Pow"	The Black Eyed Peas	
15 June	"Boom Boom Pow"	The Black Eyed Peas	
22 June	"Boom Boom Pow"	The Black Eyed Peas	
29 June	"I Gotta Feeling"	The Black Eyed Peas	
6 July	"I Gotta Feeling"	The Black Eyed Peas	
13 July	"I Gotta Feeling"	The Black Eyed Peas	
20 July	"I Gotta Feeling"	The Black Eyed Peas	
27 July	"I Gotta Feeling"	The Black Eyed Peas	
3 August	"I Gotta Feeling"	The Black Eyed Peas	
10 August	"I Gotta Feeling"	The Black Eyed Peas	
17 August	"Sexy Bitch"	David Guetta featuring Akon	
24 August	"Sexy Bitch"	David Guetta featuring Akon	
31 August	"Sexy Bitch"	David Guetta featuring Akon	
7 September	"Like It Like That"	Guy Sebastian	
14 September	"Like It Like That"	Guy Sebastian	
21 September	"Sexy Bitch"	David Guetta featuring Akon	
28 September	"Sexy Bitch"	David Guetta featuring Akon	
5 October	"Sexy Bitch"	David Guetta featuring Akon	
12 October	"Sexy Bitch"	David Guetta featuring Akon	
19 October	"This Is Who I Am"	Vanessa Amorosi	
26 October	"This Is Who I Am"	Vanessa Amorosi	
2 November	"Meet Me Halfway"	The Black Eyed Peas	
9 November	"Tik Tok"	Kesha	
16 November	"Tik Tok"	Kesha	
23 November	"Tik Tok"	Kesha	
30 November	"Tik Tok"	Kesha	
7 December	"Tik Tok"	Kesha	
14 December	"Tik Tok"	Kesha	
21 December	"Tik Tok"	Kesha	
28 December	"Tik Tok"	Kesha	

== Number-one artists ==
Position	Artist	Weeks at No. 1
1	Kesha	15
2	The Black Eyed Peas	14
3	Flo Rida	7
3	David Guetta	7
3	Akon (as featuring)	7
4	The Fray	4
5	Lady Gaga	2
5	Taylor Swift	2
5	A. R. Rahman	2
5	The Pussycat Dolls	2
5	Nicole Scherzinger (as featuring)	2
5	Guy Sebastian	2
5	Vanessa Amorosi	2
6	Jessica Mauboy	1
6	Eminem	1

== See also ==
- 2009 in music
- List of number-one albums of 2009 (Australia)
- List of Top 25 singles for 2009 in Australia
- List of top 10 singles in 2009 (Australia)
